This page lists all described genera and species of the spider family Theridiidae. , the World Spider Catalog accepts 3028 species in 124 genera:

A

Achaearanea

Achaearanea Strand, 1929
 Achaearanea alboinsignita Locket, 1980 — Comoros
 Achaearanea baltoformis Yin & Peng, 2012 — China
 Achaearanea biarclata Yin & Bao, 2012 — China
 Achaearanea budana Tikader, 1970 — India
 Achaearanea coilioducta Yin, 2012 — China
 Achaearanea diglipuriensis Tikader, 1977 — India (Andaman Is.)
 Achaearanea disparata Denis, 1965 — Gabon, Côte d'Ivoire
 Achaearanea diversipes (Rainbow, 1920) — Australia (Norfolk Is., Lord Howe Is.)
 Achaearanea dubitabilis Wunderlich, 1987 — Canary Is.
 Achaearanea durgae Tikader, 1970 — India
 Achaearanea epicosma (Rainbow, 1920) — Australia (Lord Howe Is.)
 Achaearanea extumida Xing, Gao & Zhu, 1994 — China
 Achaearanea flavomaculata Yin, 2012 — China
 Achaearanea globispira Henschel & Jocqué, 1994 — South Africa
 Achaearanea hieroglyphica (Mello-Leitão, 1940) — Peru, Brazil, French Guiana
 Achaearanea inopinata Brignoli, 1972 — Venezuela
 Achaearanea linhan Yin & Bao, 2012 — China
 Achaearanea machaera Levi, 1959 — Panama
 Achaearanea maricaoensis (Bryant, 1942) — Panama, Puerto Rico
 Achaearanea micratula (Banks, 1909) — Costa Rica
 Achaearanea nigrodecorata (Rainbow, 1920) — Australia (Lord Howe Is.)
 Achaearanea palgongensis Seo, 1993 — Korea
 Achaearanea propera (Keyserling, 1890) — Australia (New South Wales, Tasmania, Lord Howe Is.)
 Achaearanea septemguttata (Simon, 1909) — Vietnam
 Achaearanea simaoica Zhu, 1998 — China
 Achaearanea tingo Levi, 1963 — Peru, Brazil
 Achaearanea trapezoidalis (Taczanowski, 1873) (type) — Panama to Paraguay
 Achaearanea triangularis Patel, 2005 — India

Achaearyopa

Achaearyopa Barrion & Litsinger, 1995
 Achaearyopa pnaca Barrion & Litsinger, 1995 (type) — Philippines

Achaeridion

Achaeridion Wunderlich, 2008
 Achaeridion conigerum (Simon, 1914) (type) — Europe, Turkey

Allothymoites

Allothymoites Ono, 2007
 Allothymoites kumadai Ono, 2007 (type) — China, Japan
 Allothymoites repandus Gao & Li, 2014 — China
 Allothymoites sculptilis Gao & Li, 2014 — China

Ameridion

Ameridion Wunderlich, 1995
 Ameridion armouri (Levi, 1959) — Panama, Trinidad
 Ameridion aspersum (F. O. Pickard-Cambridge, 1902) — Guatemala
 Ameridion atlixco (Levi, 1959) — Mexico
 Ameridion bridgesi (Levi, 1959) — Mexico
 Ameridion chilapa (Levi, 1959) — Mexico
 Ameridion clemens (Levi, 1959) — Jamaica
 Ameridion cobanum (Levi, 1959) — Guatemala
 Ameridion colima (Levi, 1959) — Mexico, Ecuador
 Ameridion lathropi (Levi, 1959) — Panama
 Ameridion malkini (Levi, 1959) — Mexico
 Ameridion marvum (Levi, 1959) — Panama, Venezuela
 Ameridion moctezuma (Levi, 1959) — Mexico
 Ameridion musawas (Levi, 1959) — Nicaragua
 Ameridion paidiscum (Levi, 1959) — Panama
 Ameridion panum (Levi, 1959) — Panama
 Ameridion petrum (Levi, 1959) (type) — Panama, Trinidad, Peru
 Ameridion plantatum (Levi, 1959) — Panama
 Ameridion progum (Levi, 1959) — Panama
 Ameridion quantum (Levi, 1959) — Costa Rica, Panama
 Ameridion reservum (Levi, 1959) — Panama
 Ameridion rinconense (Levi, 1959) — Mexico
 Ameridion ruinum (Levi, 1959) — Mexico
 Ameridion schmidti (Levi, 1959) — Costa Rica
 Ameridion signaculum (Levi, 1959) — Panama, Brazil
 Ameridion signum (Levi, 1959) — Panama
 Ameridion tempum (Levi, 1959) — Panama, Brazil
 Ameridion unanimum (Keyserling, 1891) — Mexico to Brazil

Anatea

Anatea Berland, 1927
 Anatea elongata Smith, 2017 — Australia (Queensland)
 Anatea formicaria Berland, 1927 (type) — New Caledonia
 Anatea monteithi Smith, 2017 — Australia (Queensland)

Anatolidion

Anatolidion Wunderlich, 2008
 Anatolidion gentile (Simon, 1881) (type) — Morocco, Algeria, Portugal, Spain, France, Italy, Macedonia, Greece, Turkey

Anelosimus

Anelosimus Simon, 1891
 Anelosimus agnar Agnarsson, 2006 — Malaysia
 Anelosimus amelie Agnarsson, 2009 — Comoros, Mayotte
 Anelosimus analyticus (Chamberlin, 1924) — USA, Mexico
 Anelosimus andasibe Agnarsson & Kuntner, 2005 — Madagascar
 Anelosimus arizona Agnarsson, 2006 — USA, Mexico
 Anelosimus ata Agnarsson, Kuntner & Jencik, 2015 — Madagascar
 Anelosimus baeza Agnarsson, 2006 — Mexico to Brazil
 Anelosimus bali Agnarsson, 2012 — Bali
 Anelosimus biglebowski Agnarsson, 2006 — Tanzania
 Anelosimus buffoni Agnarsson, Kuntner & Jencik, 2015 — Madagascar
 Anelosimus chickeringi Levi, 1956 — Mexico to Peru
 Anelosimus chonganicus Zhu, 1998 — China
 Anelosimus crassipes (Bösenberg & Strand, 1906) — China, Korea, Japan, Ryukyu Is.
 Anelosimus darwini Agnarsson, Kuntner & Jencik, 2015 — Madagascar
 Anelosimus decaryi (Fage, 1930) — Seychelles (Aldabra), Madagascar, Comoros, Mayotte
 Anelosimus dialeucon (Simon, 1890) — Yemen
 Anelosimus dianiphus (Rainbow, 1916) — Australia (Queensland)
 Anelosimus domingo Levi, 1963 — Colombia to Suriname and Peru
 Anelosimus dubiosus (Keyserling, 1891) — Brazil
 Anelosimus dubius (Tullgren, 1910) — Tanzania
 Anelosimus dude Agnarsson, 2006 — Tanzania
 Anelosimus eidur Agnarsson, 2012 — New Guinea
 Anelosimus elegans Agnarsson, 2006 — Mexico to Peru
 Anelosimus ethicus (Keyserling, 1884) — Brazil
 Anelosimus exiguus Yoshida, 1986 — China, Japan, Ryukyu Is.
 Anelosimus eximius (Keyserling, 1884) (type) — Lesser Antilles, Panama to Argentina
 Anelosimus fraternus Bryant, 1948 — Hispaniola
 Anelosimus guacamayos Agnarsson, 2006 — Ecuador
 Anelosimus hookeri Agnarsson, Kuntner & Jencik, 2015 — Madagascar
 Anelosimus huxleyi Agnarsson, Veve & Kuntner, 2015 — Madagascar
 Anelosimus inhandava Agnarsson, 2005 — Brazil, Argentina
 Anelosimus iwawakiensis Yoshida, 1986 — Korea, Japan
 Anelosimus jabaquara Levi, 1956 — Brazil
 Anelosimus jucundus (O. Pickard-Cambridge, 1896) — Mexico to Argentina
 Anelosimus kohi Yoshida, 1993 — Malaysia, Singapore
 Anelosimus lamarcki Agnarsson & Goh, 2015 — Madagascar
 Anelosimus linda Agnarsson, 2006 — Malaysia
 Anelosimus lorenzo Fowler & Levi, 1979 — Brazil, Paraguay, Uruguay, Argentina
 Anelosimus luckyi Agnarsson, 2012 — New Guinea
 Anelosimus may Agnarsson, 2005 — Madagascar
 Anelosimus membranaceus Zhang, Liu & Zhang, 2011 — China
 Anelosimus misiones Agnarsson, 2005 — Argentina
 Anelosimus monskenyensis Agnarsson, 2006 — Kenya
 Anelosimus moramora Agnarsson, Kuntner & Jencik, 2015 — Madagascar
 Anelosimus nazariani Agnarsson & Kuntner, 2005 — Madagascar
 Anelosimus nelsoni Agnarsson, 2006 — South Africa
 Anelosimus nigrescens (Keyserling, 1884) — Guyana, Brazil
 Anelosimus octavius Agnarsson, 2006 — Mexico to Costa Rica
 Anelosimus oritoyacu Agnarsson, 2006 — Mexico to Ecuador
 Anelosimus pacificus Levi, 1956 — Mexico to Costa Rica, Jamaica
 Anelosimus pantanal Agnarsson, 2006 — Brazil
 Anelosimus placens (Blackwall, 1877) — Seychelles
 Anelosimus pomio Agnarsson, 2012 — Papua New Guinea (New Britain)
 Anelosimus potmosbi Agnarsson, 2012 — New Guinea
 Anelosimus pratchetti Agnarsson, 2012 — Australia (New South Wales)
 Anelosimus pulchellus (Walckenaer, 1802) — Europe, Caucasus, Iran, North Africa
 Anelosimus puravida Agnarsson, 2006 — Guatemala to Panama
 Anelosimus rabus Levi, 1963 — Brazil
 Anelosimus rupununi Levi, 1956 — Trinidad to Brazil
 Anelosimus sallee Agnarsson & Kuntner, 2005 — Madagascar
 Anelosimus salut Agnarsson & Kuntner, 2005 — Madagascar
 Anelosimus seximaculatus (Zhu, 1998) — China
 Anelosimus studiosus (Hentz, 1850) — USA to Argentina
 Anelosimus subcrassipes Zhang, Liu & Zhang, 2011 — China
 Anelosimus sulawesi Agnarsson, 2006 — Indonesia (Sulawesi)
 Anelosimus sumisolena Agnarsson, 2005 — Brazil
 Anelosimus taiwanicus Yoshida, 1986 — Taiwan, Indonesia (Krakatau)
 Anelosimus terraincognita Agnarsson, 2012 — possibly Australasia
 Anelosimus tita Agnarsson, Kuntner & Jencik, 2015 — Madagascar
 Anelosimus torfi Agnarsson, 2015 — Madagascar
 Anelosimus tosus (Chamberlin, 1916) — Mexico to Peru
 Anelosimus vierae Agnarsson, 2012 — Uruguay, Argentina
 Anelosimus vittatus (C. L. Koch, 1836) — Europe, Turkey, Caucasus
 Anelosimus vondrona Agnarsson & Kuntner, 2005 — Madagascar
 Anelosimus wallacei Agnarsson, Veve & Kuntner, 2015 — Madagascar

Argyrodella

Argyrodella Saaristo, 2006
 Argyrodella pusillus (Saaristo, 1978) (type) — Seychelles

Argyrodes

Argyrodes Simon, 1864
 Argyrodes abscissus O. Pickard-Cambridge, 1880 — Madagascar
 Argyrodes alannae Grostal, 1999 — Eastern Australia
 Argyrodes ambalikae Tikader, 1970 — India
 Argyrodes amboinensis Thorell, 1878 — Indonesia (Sulawesi, Ambon), New Guinea, New Caledonia
 Argyrodes antipodianus O. Pickard-Cambridge, 1880 — Australia, New Caledonia, New Zealand
 Argyrodes apiculatus Thorell, 1895 — Myanmar
 Argyrodes argentatus O. Pickard-Cambridge, 1880 — India, Indonesia to China. Introduced to Hawaii
 Argyrodes argyrodes (Walckenaer, 1841) (type) — Mediterranean to West Africa, Seychelles
 Argyrodes atriapicatus Strand, 1906 — Ethiopia
 Argyrodes bandanus Strand, 1911 — Indonesia (Banda Is.)
 Argyrodes benedicti Lopez, 1988 — French Guiana
 Argyrodes binotatus Rainbow, 1915 — Australia
 Argyrodes bonadea (Karsch, 1881) — India, China, Korea, Taiwan, Japan, Philippines
 Argyrodes borbonicus Lopez, 1990 — Réunion
 Argyrodes callipygus Thorell, 1895 — Myanmar
 Argyrodes calmettei Lopez, 1990 — Réunion
 Argyrodes chionus Roberts, 1983 — Seychelles (Aldabra)
 Argyrodes chiriatapuensis Tikader, 1977 — India (Andaman Is.)
 Argyrodes chounguii Lopez, 2010 — Mayotte
 Argyrodes coactatus Lopez, 1988 — French Guiana
 Argyrodes cognatus (Blackwall, 1877) — Seychelles
 Argyrodes convivans Lawrence, 1937 — South Africa
 Argyrodes cylindratus Thorell, 1898 — China, Myanmar to Japan
 Argyrodes cyrtophorae Tikader, 1963 — India
 Argyrodes delicatulus Thorell, 1878 — Indonesia (Ambon)
 Argyrodes dipali Tikader, 1963 — India
 Argyrodes elevatus Taczanowski, 1873 — USA to Argentina, Galapagos Is.
 Argyrodes exlineae (Caporiacco, 1949) — Kenya
 Argyrodes fasciatus Thorell, 1892 — Malaysia, Singapore
 Argyrodes fissifrons O. Pickard-Cambridge, 1869 — Sri Lanka to Indonesia, Papua New Guinea, China, Australia (Queensland)
 Argyrodes fissifrons terressae Thorell, 1891 — India (Nicobar Is.)
 Argyrodes fissifrontellus Saaristo, 1978 — Seychelles
 Argyrodes flavescens O. Pickard-Cambridge, 1880 — India, Sri Lanka to Japan, New Guinea
 Argyrodes flavipes Rainbow, 1916 — Australia (Queensland)
 Argyrodes fragilis Thorell, 1877 — Indonesia (Sulawesi)
 Argyrodes gazedes Tikader, 1970 — India
 Argyrodes gazingensis Tikader, 1970 — India
 Argyrodes gemmatus Rainbow, 1920 — Australia (Lord Howe Is.)
 Argyrodes gouri Tikader, 1963 — India
 Argyrodes gracilis (L. Koch, 1872) — Australia (Lord Howe Is.), New Caledonia, Samoa
 Argyrodes hawaiiensis Simon, 1900 — Hawaii
 Argyrodes ilipoepoe Rivera & Gillespie, 2010 — Hawaii
 Argyrodes incertus Wunderlich, 1987 — Canary Is.
 Argyrodes incisifrons Keyserling, 1890 — Australia (Queensland)
 Argyrodes incursus Gray & Anderson, 1989 — Australia (New South Wales, Lord Howe Is.)
 Argyrodes insectus Schmidt, 2005 — Cape Verde Is.
 Argyrodes jamkhedes Tikader, 1963 — India
 Argyrodes kratochvili (Caporiacco, 1949) — Kenya
 Argyrodes kualensis Hogg, 1927 — Malaysia
 Argyrodes kulczynskii (Roewer, 1942) — New Guinea
 Argyrodes kumadai Chida & Tanikawa, 1999 — China, Taiwan, Japan
 Argyrodes laja Rivera & Gillespie, 2010 — Hawaii
 Argyrodes lanyuensis Yoshida, Tso & Severinghaus, 1998 — Taiwan
 Argyrodes lepidus O. Pickard-Cambridge, 1880 — New Zealand
 Argyrodes levuca Strand, 1915 — Fiji
 Argyrodes lucmae Chamberlin, 1916 — Peru
 Argyrodes maculiger Strand, 1911 — Indonesia (Kei Is.)
 Argyrodes margaritarius (Rainbow, 1894) — Australia (New South Wales)
 Argyrodes mellissi (O. Pickard-Cambridge, 1870) — St. Helena
 Argyrodes mertoni Strand, 1911 — Indonesia (Aru Is.)
 Argyrodes meus Strand, 1907 — Madagascar
 Argyrodes meus poecilior Strand, 1913 — Central Africa
 Argyrodes miltosus Zhu & Song, 1991 — China
 Argyrodes minax O. Pickard-Cambridge, 1880 — Madagascar, Comoros
 Argyrodes miniaceus (Doleschall, 1857) — Korea, Japan to Australia
 Argyrodes modestus Thorell, 1899 — Cameroon
 Argyrodes nasutus O. Pickard-Cambridge, 1880 — Sri Lanka
 Argyrodes neocaledonicus Berland, 1924 — New Caledonia
 Argyrodes nephilae Taczanowski, 1873 — USA, Caribbean to Argentina, Galapagos Is. Introduced to India
 Argyrodes parcestellatus Simon, 1909 — Vietnam
 Argyrodes pluto Banks, 1906 — USA, Mexico, Jamaica
 Argyrodes praeacutus Simon, 1903 — Equatorial Guinea
 Argyrodes projeles Tikader, 1970 — India
 Argyrodes rainbowi (Roewer, 1942) — Australia (Queensland, New South Wales)
 Argyrodes reticola Strand, 1911 — Indonesia (Aru Is.)
 Argyrodes rostratus Blackwall, 1877 — Seychelles
 Argyrodes samoensis O. Pickard-Cambridge, 1880 — New Caledonia, Samoa
 Argyrodes scapulatus Schmidt & Piepho, 1994 — Cape Verde Is.
 Argyrodes scintillulanus O. Pickard-Cambridge, 1880 — India, Sri Lanka
 Argyrodes sextuberculosus Strand, 1908 — Mozambique, Madagascar
 Argyrodes sextuberculosus dilutior (Caporiacco, 1940) — Ethiopia
 Argyrodes strandi (Caporiacco, 1940) — Ethiopia
 Argyrodes stridulator Lawrence, 1937 — South Africa
 Argyrodes sublimis L. Koch, 1872 — Fiji
 Argyrodes sundaicus (Doleschall, 1859) — Thailand, Indonesia (Java), Papua New Guinea (New Britain)
 Argyrodes tenuis Thorell, 1877 — Indonesia (Sulawesi)
 Argyrodes tenuis infumatus Thorell, 1878 — Indonesia (Ambon)
 Argyrodes tripunctatus Simon, 1877 — Philippines
 Argyrodes unimaculatus (Marples, 1955) — Samoa, Tongatabu, Niue
 Argyrodes vatovae (Caporiacco, 1940) — Ethiopia
 Argyrodes viridis (Vinson, 1863) — Madagascar, Réunion
 Argyrodes vittatus Bradley, 1877 — New Guinea
 Argyrodes weyrauchi Exline & Levi, 1962 — Peru
 Argyrodes wolfi Strand, 1911 — New Guinea
 Argyrodes yunnanensis Xu, Yin & Kim, 2000 — China
 Argyrodes zhui Zhu & Song, 1991 — China
 Argyrodes zonatus (Walckenaer, 1841) — Equatorial Guinea (Bioko), East Africa, Madagascar, Réunion, Mayotte
 Argyrodes zonatus occidentalis Simon, 1903 — Guinea-Bissau

Ariamnes

Ariamnes Thorell, 1869
 Ariamnes alepeleke Gillespie & Rivera, 2007 — Hawaii
 Ariamnes attenuatus O. Pickard-Cambridge, 1881 — Costa Rica, Caribbean to Argentina
 Ariamnes birgitae Strand, 1917 — Myanmar
 Ariamnes campestratus Simon, 1903 — Gabon, Congo
 Ariamnes colubrinus Keyserling, 1890 — Australia (Queensland, New South Wales, Lord Howe Is.)
 Ariamnes columnaceus Gao & Li, 2014 — China
 Ariamnes corniger Simon, 1900 — Hawaii
 Ariamnes cylindrogaster Simon, 1889 — China, Laos, Korea, Taiwan, Japan
 Ariamnes flagellum (Doleschall, 1857) (type) — Southeast Asia, Australia
 Ariamnes flagellum nigritus Simon, 1901 — Southeast Asia
 Ariamnes haitensis (Exline & Levi, 1962) — Hispaniola
 Ariamnes helminthoides Simon, 1907 — Guinea-Bissau
 Ariamnes hiwa Gillespie & Rivera, 2007 — Hawaii
 Ariamnes huinakolu Gillespie & Rivera, 2007 — Hawaii
 Ariamnes jeanneli Berland, 1920 — East Africa
 Ariamnes kahili Gillespie & Rivera, 2007 — Hawaii
 Ariamnes laau Gillespie & Rivera, 2007 — Hawaii
 Ariamnes longissimus Keyserling, 1891 — Peru, Brazil
 Ariamnes makue Gillespie & Rivera, 2007 — Hawaii
 Ariamnes melekalikimaka Gillespie & Rivera, 2007 — Hawaii
 Ariamnes mexicanus (Exline & Levi, 1962) — Mexico, Cuba
 Ariamnes patersoniensis Hickman, 1927 — Australia (Tasmania)
 Ariamnes pavesii Leardi, 1902 — India, Sri Lanka
 Ariamnes petilus Gao & Li, 2014 — China
 Ariamnes poele Gillespie & Rivera, 2007 — Hawaii
 Ariamnes rufopictus Thorell, 1895 — Myanmar
 Ariamnes russulus Simon, 1903 — Equatorial Guinea
 Ariamnes schlingeri (Exline & Levi, 1962) — Peru
 Ariamnes setipes Hasselt, 1882 — Indonesia (Sumatra)
 Ariamnes simulans O. Pickard-Cambridge, 1892 — India
 Ariamnes triangulatus Urquhart, 1887 — New Zealand
 Ariamnes triangulus Thorell, 1887 — Myanmar
 Ariamnes uwepa Gillespie & Rivera, 2007 — Hawaii
 Ariamnes waikula Gillespie & Rivera, 2007 — Hawaii

Asagena

Asagena Sundevall, 1833
 Asagena americana Emerton, 1882 — USA, Canada, China
 Asagena brignolii (Knoflach, 1996) — Greece
 Asagena fulva (Keyserling, 1884) — USA, Mexico
 Asagena italica (Knoflach, 1996) — France (incl. Corsica), Switzerland, Italy, Algeria
 Asagena medialis (Banks, 1898) — USA, Mexico
 Asagena meridionalis Kulczyński, 1894 — Central to southeastern and eastern Europe, Georgia
 Asagena phalerata (Panzer, 1801) (type) — Europe, Turkey, Caucasus, Russia (Europe to Far East), Central Asia, China, Korea
 Asagena pulcher (Keyserling, 1884) — USA
 Asagena semideserta (Ponomarev, 2005) — Kazakhstan, Mongolia

Asygyna

Asygyna Agnarsson, 2006
 Asygyna coddingtoni Agnarsson, 2006 — Madagascar
 Asygyna huberi Agnarsson, 2006 (type) — Madagascar

Audifia

Audifia Keyserling, 1884
 Audifia duodecimpunctata Simon, 1907 — Guinea-Bissau, Congo
 Audifia laevithorax Keyserling, 1884 (type) — Brazil
 Audifia semigranosa Simon, 1895 — Brazil

B

Bardala

Bardala Saaristo, 2006
 Bardala labarda (Roberts, 1983) (type) — Seychelles (Aldabra)

Borneoridion

Borneoridion Deeleman & Wunderlich, 2011
 Borneoridion spinifer Deeleman & Wunderlich, 2011 (type) — Borneo

Brunepisinus

Brunepisinus Yoshida & Koh, 2011
 Brunepisinus selirong Yoshida & Koh, 2011 (type) — Borneo

C

Cabello

Cabello Levi, 1964
 Cabello eugeni Levi, 1964 (type) — Venezuela

Cameronidion

Cameronidion Wunderlich, 2011
 Cameronidion punctatellum Wunderlich, 2011 (type) — Malaysia

Campanicola

Campanicola Yoshida, 2015
 Campanicola campanulata (Chen, 1993) — China
 Campanicola chitouensis Yoshida, 2015 — Taiwan
 Campanicola ferrumequina (Bösenberg & Strand, 1906) — China, Korea, Japan
 Campanicola formosana Yoshida, 2015 (type) — Taiwan
 Campanicola tanakai Yoshida, 2015 — Taiwan

Canalidion

Canalidion Wunderlich, 2008
 Canalidion montanum (Emerton, 1882) (type) — North America, Scandinavia, Russia (Europe to Far East)

Carniella

Carniella Thaler & Steinberger, 1988
 Carniella brignolii Thaler & Steinberger, 1988 (type) — Belgium, Switzerland, Germany, Austria, Romania
 Carniella detriticola (Miller, 1970) — Angola
 Carniella foliosa Gao & Li, 2014 — China
 Carniella forficata Gao & Li, 2014 — China
 Carniella globifera (Simon, 1899) — Indonesia (Sumatra)
 Carniella krakatauensis Wunderlich, 1995 — Indonesia (Krakatau)
 Carniella orites Knoflach, 1996 — Thailand
 Carniella schwendingeri Knoflach, 1996 — Thailand
 Carniella siam Knoflach, 1996 — Thailand
 Carniella strumifera Gao & Li, 2014 — China
 Carniella sumatraensis Wunderlich, 1995 — Indonesia (Sumatra)
 Carniella tsurui Ono, 2007 — Taiwan
 Carniella weyersi (Brignoli, 1979) — China, Indonesia (Sumatra)

Cephalobares

Cephalobares O. Pickard-Cambridge, 1871
 Cephalobares globiceps O. Pickard-Cambridge, 1871 (type) — Sri Lanka, China
 Cephalobares yangdingi Gao & Li, 2010 — China

Cerocida

Cerocida Simon, 1894
 Cerocida ducke Marques & Buckup, 1989 — Brazil
 Cerocida strigosa Simon, 1894 (type) — Venezuela, Guyana

Chikunia

Chikunia Yoshida, 2009
 Chikunia albipes (Saito, 1935) (type) — Russia (Far East), China, Korea, Japan
 Chikunia nigra (O. Pickard-Cambridge, 1880) — Sri Lanka to Taiwan, Indonesia

Chorizopella

Chorizopella Lawrence, 1947
 Chorizopella tragardhi Lawrence, 1947 (type) — South Africa

Chrosiothes

Chrosiothes Simon, 1894
 Chrosiothes carajaensis Puchulú-Figueiredo, Santanna & Rodrigues, 2017 — Brazil
 Chrosiothes chirica (Levi, 1954) — USA, Mexico
 Chrosiothes cicuta Puchulú-Figueiredo, Santanna & Rodrigues, 2017 — Brazil
 Chrosiothes decorus Puchulú-Figueiredo, Santanna & Rodrigues, 2017 — Brazil
 Chrosiothes diabolicus Puchulú-Figueiredo, Santanna & Rodrigues, 2017 — Brazil
 Chrosiothes episinoides (Levi, 1963) — Chile
 Chrosiothes fulvus Yoshida, Tso & Severinghaus, 2000 — Taiwan
 Chrosiothes goodnightorum (Levi, 1954) — Mexico to Costa Rica
 Chrosiothes iviei Levi, 1964 — USA
 Chrosiothes jamaicensis Levi, 1964 — Jamaica, Dominican Rep.
 Chrosiothes jenningsi Piel, 1995 — USA
 Chrosiothes jocosus (Gertsch & Davis, 1936) — USA, Mexico
 Chrosiothes litus Levi, 1964 — Mexico
 Chrosiothes minusculus (Gertsch, 1936) — USA, Mexico
 Chrosiothes murici Puchulú-Figueiredo, Santanna & Rodrigues, 2017 — Brazil
 Chrosiothes niteroi Levi, 1964 — Bolivia, Brazil, Argentina
 Chrosiothes perfidus Marques & Buckup, 1997 — Brazil
 Chrosiothes portalensis Levi, 1964 — USA, Mexico
 Chrosiothes proximus (O. Pickard-Cambridge, 1899) — Mexico to Panama
 Chrosiothes silvaticus Simon, 1894 (type) — USA to Ecuador
 Chrosiothes sudabides (Bösenberg & Strand, 1906) — China, Korea, Japan
 Chrosiothes taiwan Yoshida, Tso & Severinghaus, 2000 — Taiwan
 Chrosiothes tonala (Levi, 1954) — Mexico to Honduras
 Chrosiothes una Puchulú-Figueiredo, Santanna & Rodrigues, 2017 — Brazil
 Chrosiothes valmonti (Simon, 1898) — St. Vincent
 Chrosiothes venturosus Marques & Buckup, 1997 — Brazil
 Chrosiothes wagneri (Levi, 1954) — Mexico

Chrysso

Chrysso O. Pickard-Cambridge, 1882
 Chrysso albomaculata O. Pickard-Cambridge, 1882 (type) — USA, Caribbean to Brazil
 Chrysso alecula Levi, 1962 — Panama
 Chrysso anei Barrion & Litsinger, 1995 — Philippines
 Chrysso angula (Tikader, 1970) — India
 Chrysso antonio Levi, 1962 — Brazil
 Chrysso arima Levi, 1962 — Trinidad
 Chrysso arops Levi, 1962 — Brazil
 Chrysso backstromi (Berland, 1924) — Chile (Juan Fernandez Is.)
 Chrysso barrosmachadoi Caporiacco, 1955 — Venezuela
 Chrysso bicuspidata Zhang & Zhang, 2012 — China
 Chrysso bifurca Zhang & Zhang, 2012 — China
 Chrysso bimaculata Yoshida, 1998 — China, Japan
 Chrysso calima Buckup & Marques, 1992 — Brazil
 Chrysso cambridgei (Petrunkevitch, 1911) — Mexico to Venezuela
 Chrysso caudigera Yoshida, 1993 — China, Taiwan
 Chrysso compressa (Keyserling, 1884) — Peru, Brazil
 Chrysso cyclocera Zhu, 1998 — China
 Chrysso dentaria Gao & Li, 2014 — China
 Chrysso diplosticha Chamberlin & Ivie, 1936 — Panama to Peru
 Chrysso ecuadorensis Levi, 1957 — Colombia to Bolivia
 Chrysso fanjingshan Song, Zhang & Zhu, 2006 — China
 Chrysso foliata (L. Koch, 1878) — Russia (Far East), China, Korea, Japan
 Chrysso gounellei Levi, 1962 — Brazil
 Chrysso hejunhuai Barrion, Barrion-Dupo & Heong, 2013 — China
 Chrysso huae Tang, Yin & Peng, 2003 — China
 Chrysso huanuco Levi, 1957 — Peru
 Chrysso hyoshidai Barrion, Barrion-Dupo & Heong, 2013 — China
 Chrysso indicifera Chamberlin & Ivie, 1936 — Panama to Peru
 Chrysso intervales Gonzaga, Leiner & Santos, 2006 — Brazil
 Chrysso isumbo Barrion & Litsinger, 1995 — Philippines
 Chrysso lativentris Yoshida, 1993 — China, Korea, Taiwan
 Chrysso lingchuanensis Zhu & Zhang, 1992 — China
 Chrysso longshanensis Yin, 2012 — China
 Chrysso mariae Levi, 1957 — Peru
 Chrysso melba Levi, 1962 — Panama
 Chrysso nigriceps Keyserling, 1884 — Colombia, Ecuador
 Chrysso nigrosterna Keyserling, 1891 — Brazil
 Chrysso nordica (Chamberlin & Ivie, 1947) — France, Hungary, Ukraine, Russia (Europe to Far East), Kazakhstan, Mongolia, North America
 Chrysso orchis Yoshida, Tso & Severinghaus, 2000 — Taiwan
 Chrysso oxycera Zhu & Song, 1993 — China
 Chrysso pelyx (Levi, 1957) — USA
 Chrysso pulchra (Keyserling, 1891) — Brazil
 Chrysso questona Levi, 1962 — Costa Rica, Panama, Trinidad
 Chrysso rubrovittata (Keyserling, 1884) — Brazil, Argentina
 Chrysso sasakii Yoshida, 2001 — Japan
 Chrysso scintillans (Thorell, 1895) — Myanmar, India, China, Korea, Japan, Philippines
 Chrysso sicki Levi, 1957 — Brazil
 Chrysso sikkimensis (Tikader, 1970) — India
 Chrysso silva Levi, 1962 — Panama
 Chrysso simoni Levi, 1962 — Venezuela
 Chrysso subrapula Zhu, 1998 — China
 Chrysso sulcata (Keyserling, 1884) — Peru, Bolivia, Brazil
 Chrysso tiboli Barrion & Litsinger, 1995 — Philippines
 Chrysso trimaculata Zhu, Zhang & Xu, 1991 — China, Taiwan, Thailand
 Chrysso trispinula Zhu, 1998 — China
 Chrysso urbasae (Tikader, 1970) — India
 Chrysso vallensis Levi, 1957 — Panama
 Chrysso vexabilis Keyserling, 1884 — Panama to Argentina
 Chrysso viridiventris Yoshida, 1996 — Taiwan, Japan (Ryukyu Is.)
 Chrysso vitra Zhu, 1998 — China
 Chrysso vittatula (Roewer, 1942) — Colombia to Bolivia
 Chrysso volcanensis Levi, 1962 — Costa Rica, Panama
 Chrysso wangi Zhu, 1998 — China
 Chrysso wenxianensis Zhu, 1998 — China
 Chrysso yulingu Barrion, Barrion-Dupo & Heong, 2013 — China

Coleosoma

Coleosoma O. Pickard-Cambridge, 1882
 Coleosoma acutiventer (Keyserling, 1884) — USA to Argentina
 Coleosoma africanum Schmidt & Krause, 1995 — Cape Verde Is.
 Coleosoma blandum O. Pickard-Cambridge, 1882 (type) — Seychelles, Bangladesh, Burma, Thailand, Philippines, China, Japan
 Coleosoma caliothripsum Barrion & Litsinger, 1995 — Philippines
 Coleosoma floridanum Banks, 1900 — North, Central and South America. Introduced to Europe, Macaronesia, West Africa, Seychelles, Pacific Is.
 Coleosoma matinikum Barrion & Litsinger, 1995 — Philippines
 Coleosoma normale Bryant, 1944 — USA to Brazil
 Coleosoma octomaculatum (Bösenberg & Strand, 1906) — China, Korea, Taiwan, Japan. Introduced to New Zealand
 Coleosoma pabilogum Barrion & Litsinger, 1995 — Philippines
 Coleosoma pseudoblandum Barrion & Litsinger, 1995 — Philippines

Coscinida

Coscinida Simon, 1895
 Coscinida asiatica Zhu & Zhang, 1992 — China
 Coscinida coreana Paik, 1995 — Korea
 Coscinida decemguttata Miller, 1970 — Congo
 Coscinida gentilis Simon, 1895 — Sri Lanka
 Coscinida hunanensis Yin, Peng & Bao, 2006 — China
 Coscinida japonica Yoshida, 1994 — Japan
 Coscinida leviorum Locket, 1968 — Angola
 Coscinida lugubris (Tullgren, 1910) — Tanzania
 Coscinida novemnotata Simon, 1895 — Sri Lanka
 Coscinida proboscidea Simon, 1899 — Indonesia (Sumatra)
 Coscinida propinqua Miller, 1970 — Angola
 Coscinida shimenensis Yin, Peng & Bao, 2006 — China
 Coscinida tibialis Simon, 1895 (type) — Africa, southern Europe, Turkey, Israel, Yemen. Introduced to Thailand
 Coscinida triangulifera Simon, 1904 — Sri Lanka, Indonesia (Java)
 Coscinida ulleungensis Paik, 1995 — Korea
 Coscinida yei Yin & Bao, 2012 — China

Craspedisia

Craspedisia Simon, 1894
 Craspedisia cornuta (Keyserling, 1891) (type) — Brazil
 Craspedisia longioembolia Yin, Griswold, Bao & Xu, 2003 — China
 Craspedisia spatulata Bryant, 1948 — Hispaniola

Crustulina

Crustulina Menge, 1868
 Crustulina albovittata (Thorell, 1875) — Ukraine
 Crustulina altera Gertsch & Archer, 1942 — USA
 Crustulina ambigua Simon, 1889 — Madagascar
 Crustulina bicruciata Simon, 1908 — Australia (Western Australia)
 Crustulina conspicua (O. Pickard-Cambridge, 1872) — Egypt, Israel, Syria
 Crustulina erythropus (Lucas, 1846) — Morocco, Algeria
 Crustulina grayi Chrysanthus, 1975 — New Guinea
 Crustulina guttata (Wider, 1834) (type) — Canary Is., Europe, Caucasus, Russia (Europe to south Siberia), Central Asia, China, Korea, Japan
 Crustulina hermonensis Levy & Amitai, 1979 — Israel
 Crustulina incerta Tullgren, 1910 — Tanzania
 Crustulina jeanneli Berland, 1920 — East Africa
 Crustulina lugubris Chrysanthus, 1975 — New Guinea
 Crustulina molesta (Pavesi, 1883) — Ethiopia
 Crustulina obesa Berland, 1920 — East Africa
 Crustulina scabripes Simon, 1881 — Mediterranean
 Crustulina starmuehlneri Kritscher, 1966 — New Caledonia
 Crustulina sticta (O. Pickard-Cambridge, 1861) — North America, Europe, Turkey, Caucasus, Russia (Europe to Far East), Central Asia, China, Korea, Japan

Cryptachaea

Cryptachaea Archer, 1946
 Cryptachaea alacris (Keyserling, 1884) — Colombia, Venezuela
 Cryptachaea alleluia Rodrigues & Poeta, 2015 — Brazil
 Cryptachaea altiventer (Keyserling, 1884) — Brazil
 Cryptachaea amazonas Buckup, Marques & Rodrigues, 2012 — Brazil
 Cryptachaea ambera (Levi, 1963) — USA
 Cryptachaea analista (Levi, 1963) — Brazil
 Cryptachaea anastema (Levi, 1963) — Venezuela
 Cryptachaea azteca (Chamberlin & Ivie, 1936) — Mexico
 Cryptachaea banosensis (Levi, 1963) — Ecuador
 Cryptachaea barra (Levi, 1963) — Brazil
 Cryptachaea bellula (Keyserling, 1891) — Brazil
 Cryptachaea benivia Rodrigues & Poeta, 2015 — Bolivia
 Cryptachaea blattea (Urquhart, 1886) — Africa. Introduced to USA, Chile, Azores, Europe, Australia, New Zealand, Hawaii
 Cryptachaea bonaldoi Buckup, Marques & Rodrigues, 2010 — Brazil
 Cryptachaea brescoviti Buckup, Marques & Rodrigues, 2010 — Bolivia, Brazil
 Cryptachaea caliensis (Levi, 1963) — Colombia, Ecuador
 Cryptachaea canionis (Chamberlin & Gertsch, 1929) — USA
 Cryptachaea caqueza (Levi, 1963) — Colombia
 Cryptachaea catita Rodrigues & Poeta, 2015 — Brazil, Argentina
 Cryptachaea chilensis (Levi, 1963) — Chile
 Cryptachaea chiricahua (Levi, 1955) — USA
 Cryptachaea cidae Rodrigues & Poeta, 2015 — Brazil
 Cryptachaea cinnabarina (Levi, 1963) — Brazil
 Cryptachaea dalana (Buckup & Marques, 1991) — Brazil
 Cryptachaea dea (Buckup & Marques, 2006) — Brazil
 Cryptachaea digitus (Buckup & Marques, 2006) — Brazil
 Cryptachaea divisor Rodrigues & Poeta, 2015 — Brazil
 Cryptachaea dromedariformis (Roewer, 1942) — Ecuador, Peru
 Cryptachaea eramus (Levi, 1963) — Brazil
 Cryptachaea ericae Rodrigues & Poeta, 2015 — Brazil
 Cryptachaea floresta Rodrigues & Poeta, 2015 — Brazil
 Cryptachaea fresno (Levi, 1955) — USA
 Cryptachaea gigantea (Keyserling, 1884) — Peru
 Cryptachaea gigantipes (Keyserling, 1890) — Australia (Queensland to Tasmania, Norfolk Is.), New Zealand
 Cryptachaea hirta (Taczanowski, 1873) — Panama to Argentina
 Cryptachaea ingijonathorum Buckup, Marques & Rodrigues, 2012 — French Guiana
 Cryptachaea inops (Levi, 1963) — Brazil, Guyana
 Cryptachaea insulsa (Gertsch & Mulaik, 1936) — USA, Mexico
 Cryptachaea isana (Levi, 1963) — Brazil
 Cryptachaea jequirituba (Levi, 1963) — Brazil, Paraguay, Argentina
 Cryptachaea kaspi (Levi, 1963) — Peru
 Cryptachaea koepckei (Levi, 1963) — Peru
 Cryptachaea lavia Rodrigues & Poeta, 2015 — Bolivia
 Cryptachaea lisei Buckup, Marques & Rodrigues, 2010 — Brazil
 Cryptachaea lota (Levi, 1963) — Chile
 Cryptachaea maldonado Buckup, Marques & Rodrigues, 2012 — Peru, Brazil
 Cryptachaea manzanillo (Levi, 1959) — Mexico
 Cryptachaea maraca (Buckup & Marques, 1991) — Brazil
 Cryptachaea meraukensis (Chrysanthus, 1963) — New Guinea
 Cryptachaea migrans (Keyserling, 1884) — Venezuela to Peru, Brazil
 Cryptachaea milagro (Levi, 1963) — Ecuador
 Cryptachaea nayaritensis (Levi, 1959) — Mexico
 Cryptachaea oblivia (O. Pickard-Cambridge, 1896) — Costa Rica, Panama
 Cryptachaea ogatai Yoshida, 2016 — Japan (Ryukyu Is.), Taiwan
 Cryptachaea orana (Levi, 1963) — Ecuador
 Cryptachaea pallipera (Levi, 1963) — Brazil
 Cryptachaea paquisha Rodrigues & Poeta, 2015 — Peru
 Cryptachaea parana (Levi, 1963) — Paraguay
 Cryptachaea passiva (Keyserling, 1891) — Brazil
 Cryptachaea pilaton (Levi, 1963) — Ecuador
 Cryptachaea pinguis (Keyserling, 1886) — Brazil, Uruguay
 Cryptachaea porteri (Banks, 1896) (type) — USA to Panama, Caribbean
 Cryptachaea projectivulva (Yoshida, 2001) — Japan
 Cryptachaea propinqua Rodrigues & Poeta, 2015 — Brazil
 Cryptachaea pura (O. Pickard-Cambridge, 1894) — Mexico
 Cryptachaea pusillana (Roewer, 1942) — French Guiana
 Cryptachaea pydanieli (Buckup & Marques, 1991) — Brazil
 Cryptachaea rapa (Levi, 1963) — Paraguay
 Cryptachaea rioensis (Levi, 1963) — Brazil, Argentina
 Cryptachaea riparia (Blackwall, 1834) — Europe, Turkey, Caucasus, Russia (Europe to Far East), China, Korea, Japan
 Cryptachaea rostra (Zhu & Zhang, 1992) — China
 Cryptachaea rostrata (O. Pickard-Cambridge, 1896) — Mexico to Venezuela
 Cryptachaea rupicola (Emerton, 1882) — USA, Canada
 Cryptachaea schneirlai (Levi, 1959) — Panama
 Cryptachaea schraderorum (Levi, 1959) — Costa Rica
 Cryptachaea serenoae (Gertsch & Archer, 1942) — USA
 Cryptachaea sicki (Levi, 1963) — Brazil
 Cryptachaea spectabilis Rodrigues & Poeta, 2015 — Brazil
 Cryptachaea taeniata (Keyserling, 1884) — Guatemala to Peru
 Cryptachaea taim (Buckup & Marques, 2006) — Brazil
 Cryptachaea tambopata Rodrigues & Poeta, 2015 — Peru
 Cryptachaea tovarensis (Levi, 1963) — Venezuela
 Cryptachaea triguttata (Keyserling, 1891) — Brazil
 Cryptachaea trinidensis (Levi, 1959) — Trinidad, Peru
 Cryptachaea uncina Gao & Li, 2014 — China
 Cryptachaea uviana (Levi, 1963) — Peru
 Cryptachaea veruculata (Urquhart, 1886) — Australia (mainland, Norfolk Is., Lord Howe Is.). Introduced to Britain, Belgium, New Zealand
 Cryptachaea vivida (Keyserling, 1891) — Brazil
 Cryptachaea zonensis (Levi, 1959) — Panama to Peru, Brazil

Cyllognatha

Cyllognatha L. Koch, 1872
 Cyllognatha affinis Berland, 1929 — Samoa
 Cyllognatha gracilis Marples, 1955 — Samoa
 Cyllognatha subtilis L. Koch, 1872 (type) — Australia (Lord Howe Is.), Samoa
 Cyllognatha surajbe Patel & Patel, 1972 — India

D

Deelemanella

Deelemanella Yoshida, 2003
 Deelemanella borneo Yoshida, 2003 (type) — Borneo

Dipoena

Dipoena Thorell, 1869
 Dipoena abdita Gertsch & Mulaik, 1936 — USA, Mexico, Caribbean
 Dipoena aculeata (Hickman, 1951) — Australia (Tasmania)
 Dipoena adunca Tso, Zhu & Zhang, 2005 — Taiwan
 Dipoena ahenea (Dyal, 1935) — Pakistan
 Dipoena anahuas Levi, 1963 — Mexico
 Dipoena anas Levi, 1963 — Panama, Colombia
 Dipoena appalachia Levi, 1953 — USA, Canada
 Dipoena arborea Zhang & Zhang, 2011 — China
 Dipoena atlantica Chickering, 1943 — Panama to Paraguay
 Dipoena augara Levi, 1963 — Venezuela, Brazil
 Dipoena austera Simon, 1908 — Australia (Western Australia)
 Dipoena banksi Chickering, 1943 — Costa Rica to Venezuela
 Dipoena bellingeri Levi, 1963 — Jamaica
 Dipoena beni Levi, 1963 — Bolivia
 Dipoena bernardino Levi, 1963 — USA
 Dipoena bifida Zhang & Zhang, 2011 — China
 Dipoena bimini Levi, 1963 — Bahama Is., Cuba
 Dipoena bodjensis (Simon, 1885) — Indonesia (Bodjo Is.)
 Dipoena bonitensis Rodrigues, 2013 — Brazil
 Dipoena boquete Levi, 1963 — Panama
 Dipoena braccata (C. L. Koch, 1841) — Europe, Mediterranean, Caucasus
 Dipoena bristowei Caporiacco, 1949 — Kenya
 Dipoena bryantae Chickering, 1943 — Panama, Trinidad, Brazil
 Dipoena buccalis Keyserling, 1886 — North America
 Dipoena calvata Gao & Li, 2014 — China
 Dipoena cartagena Sedgwick, 1973 — Chile
 Dipoena cathedralis Levi, 1953 — China, USA
 Dipoena chathami Levi, 1953 — USA
 Dipoena chickeringi Levi, 1953 — Panama
 Dipoena chillana Levi, 1963 — Chile
 Dipoena cidae Rodrigues, 2013 — Brazil
 Dipoena complexa Gao & Li, 2014 — China
 Dipoena cordiformis Keyserling, 1886 — Costa Rica to Brazil
 Dipoena cornuta Chickering, 1943 — Nicaragua to Bolivia
 Dipoena croatica (Chyzer, 1894) — Eastern Europe
 Dipoena crocea (O. Pickard-Cambridge, 1896) — Guatemala
 Dipoena destricta Simon, 1903 — Sierra Leone
 Dipoena dominicana Wunderlich, 1986 — Hispaniola
 Dipoena dorsata Muma, 1944 — USA to Paraguay
 Dipoena duodecimpunctata Chickering, 1943 — Panama, Venezuela, Brazil
 Dipoena eatoni Chickering, 1943 — Mexico, Panama
 Dipoena ericae Rodrigues, 2013 — Brazil
 Dipoena erythropus (Simon, 1881) — Europe
 Dipoena esra Levi, 1963 — Peru, Brazil
 Dipoena flavomaculata (Keyserling, 1891) — Brazil
 Dipoena foliata Keyserling, 1886 — Brazil
 Dipoena fornicata Thorell, 1895 — Myanmar
 Dipoena fortunata Levi, 1953 — Mexico
 Dipoena fozdoiguacuensis Rodrigues, 2013 — Brazil
 Dipoena galilaea Levy & Amitai, 1981 — Greece, Israel
 Dipoena glomerabilis Simon, 1909 — Vietnam
 Dipoena grammata Simon, 1903 — Gabon
 Dipoena granulata (Keyserling, 1886) — Brazil, Argentina
 Dipoena guaraquecaba Rodrigues, 2013 — Brazil
 Dipoena gui Zhu, 1998 — China
 Dipoena hasra Roberts, 1983 — Seychelles (Aldabra)
 Dipoena hortoni Chickering, 1943 — Panama to Brazil
 Dipoena hui Zhu, 1998 — China
 Dipoena insulana Chickering, 1943 — Mexico to Panama
 Dipoena ira Levi, 1963 — Brazil
 Dipoena isthmia Chickering, 1943 — Panama, Brazil
 Dipoena josephus Levi, 1953 — Costa Rica, Panama
 Dipoena keumunensis Paik, 1996 — Korea
 Dipoena keyserlingi Levi, 1963 — Brazil
 Dipoena kuyuwini Levi, 1963 — Venezuela, Guyana, Brazil, Bolivia
 Dipoena lana Levi, 1953 — USA, Panama
 Dipoena latifrons Denis, 1951 — France, Spain (Balearic Is.)?
 Dipoena lesnei Simon, 1899 — Algeria
 Dipoena leveillei (Simon, 1885) — Algeria, Tunisia
 Dipoena liguanea Levi, 1963 — Jamaica
 Dipoena lindholmi (Strand, 1910) — Ukraine
 Dipoena linzhiensis Hu, 2001 — China
 Dipoena longiducta Zhang & Zhang, 2011 — China
 Dipoena longiventris (Simon, 1905) — Argentina
 Dipoena lugens (O. Pickard-Cambridge, 1909) — Britain, Spain
 Dipoena luisi Levi, 1953 — Mexico
 Dipoena malkini Levi, 1953 — USA
 Dipoena meckeli Simon, 1898 — St. Vincent
 Dipoena melanogaster (C. L. Koch, 1837) (type) — Europe, North Africa to Azerbaijan, Iran
 Dipoena membranula Zhang & Zhang, 2011 — China
 Dipoena mendoza Levi, 1967 — Brazil, Argentina
 Dipoena mertoni Levi, 1963 — Panama
 Dipoena militaris Chickering, 1943 — Panama to Paraguay
 Dipoena mitifica Simon, 1899 — Indonesia (Sumatra)
 Dipoena mollis (Simon, 1903) — Equatorial Guinea
 Dipoena neotoma Levi, 1953 — USA
 Dipoena nigra (Emerton, 1882) — USA, Canada, Mexico
 Dipoena nigroreticulata (Simon, 1880) — Europe to Azerbaijan
 Dipoena nipponica Yoshida, 2002 — China, Japan
 Dipoena niteroi Levi, 1963 — Brazil
 Dipoena notata Dyal, 1935 — Pakistan
 Dipoena obscura Keyserling, 1891 — Brazil
 Dipoena ocosingo Levi, 1953 — Mexico
 Dipoena ohigginsi Levi, 1963 — Chile
 Dipoena olivenca Levi, 1963 — Brazil
 Dipoena opana Levi, 1963 — Brazil
 Dipoena origanata Levi, 1953 — Mexico
 Dipoena orvillei Chickering, 1943 — Panama
 Dipoena pacifica Chickering, 1943 — Panama, Jamaica
 Dipoena pacificana Berland, 1938 — Vanuatu
 Dipoena pallisteri Levi, 1963 — Peru
 Dipoena parki Chickering, 1943 — Panama
 Dipoena pelorosa Zhu, 1998 — China, Japan
 Dipoena peregregia Simon, 1909 — Vietnam
 Dipoena perimenta Levi, 1963 — Panama
 Dipoena peruensis Levi, 1963 — Peru, Brazil, Paraguay
 Dipoena petrunkevitchi Roewer, 1942 — Myanmar
 Dipoena picta (Thorell, 1890) — Indonesia (Sumatra)
 Dipoena plaumanni Levi, 1963 — Brazil
 Dipoena polita (Mello-Leitão, 1947) — Brazil
 Dipoena praecelsa Simon, 1914 — France
 Dipoena pristea Roberts, 1983 — Seychelles (Aldabra)
 Dipoena proterva Chickering, 1943 — Panama
 Dipoena provalis Levi, 1953 — USA
 Dipoena puertoricensis Levi, 1963 — Puerto Rico, Brazil
 Dipoena pulicaria (Thorell, 1890) — Indonesia (Sumatra)
 Dipoena pumicata (Keyserling, 1886) — Brazil, Argentina
 Dipoena punctisparsa Yaginuma, 1967 — Korea, Japan
 Dipoena pusilla (Keyserling, 1886) — Brazil
 Dipoena quadricuspis Caporiacco, 1949 — Kenya
 Dipoena redunca Zhu, 1998 — China
 Dipoena ripa Zhu, 1998 — China
 Dipoena rita Levi, 1953 — USA
 Dipoena rubella (Keyserling, 1884) — Panama to Peru, Brazil
 Dipoena santacatarinae Levi, 1963 — Brazil
 Dipoena santaritadopassaquatrensis Rodrigues, 2013 — Brazil
 Dipoena scabella Simon, 1903 — Equatorial Guinea
 Dipoena seclusa Chickering, 1948 — Panama to Venezuela
 Dipoena sedilloti (Simon, 1885) — France, Algeria, Tunisia
 Dipoena semicana Simon, 1909 — Vietnam
 Dipoena seminigra Simon, 1909 — Vietnam
 Dipoena sericata (Simon, 1880) — France
 Dipoena sertata (Simon, 1895) — Sri Lanka
 Dipoena setosa (Hickman, 1951) — Australia (Tasmania)
 Dipoena shortiducta Zhang & Zhang, 2011 — China
 Dipoena signifera Simon, 1909 — Vietnam
 Dipoena silvicola Miller, 1970 — Angola
 Dipoena standleyi Levi, 1963 — Panama
 Dipoena subflavida Thorell, 1895 — Myanmar
 Dipoena submustelina Zhu, 1998 — China
 Dipoena sulfurica Levi, 1953 — USA, Mexico
 Dipoena taeniatipes Keyserling, 1891 — Brazil
 Dipoena tecoja Levi, 1953 — Mexico
 Dipoena tingo Levi, 1963 — Peru, Brazil
 Dipoena tiro Levi, 1963 — Venezuela, Brazil
 Dipoena torva (Thorell, 1875) — Europe, Russia (Europe to south Siberia), Kazakhstan
 Dipoena transversisulcata Strand, 1908 — Madagascar
 Dipoena trinidensis Levi, 1963 — Trinidad, Brazil
 Dipoena tropica Chickering, 1943 — Panama, Colombia
 Dipoena tuldokguhitanea Barrion & Litsinger, 1995 — Philippines
 Dipoena turriceps (Schenkel, 1936) — China, Laos
 Dipoena umbratilis (Simon, 1873) — Western Mediterranean
 Dipoena variabilis (Keyserling, 1886) — Brazil
 Dipoena venusta Chickering, 1948 — Panama
 Dipoena wangi Zhu, 1998 — China, Korea
 Dipoena washougalia Levi, 1953 — USA
 Dipoena waspucensis Levi, 1963 — Nicaragua
 Dipoena woytkowskii Levi, 1963 — Venezuela, Peru
 Dipoena xanthopus Simon, 1914 — Algeria
 Dipoena yutian Hu & Wu, 1989 — China
 Dipoena zeteki Chickering, 1943 — Panama
 Dipoena zhangi Yin, 2012 — China

Dipoenata

Dipoenata Wunderlich, 1988
 Dipoenata balboae (Chickering, 1943) — Panama, Venezuela
 Dipoenata cana Kritscher, 1996 — Malta
 Dipoenata conica (Chickering, 1943) — Panama, Brazil
 Dipoenata longitarsis (Denis, 1962) — Madeira
 Dipoenata morosa (Bryant, 1948) — Hispaniola to Brazil

Dipoenura

Dipoenura Simon, 1909
 Dipoenura aplustra Zhu & Zhang, 1997 — China
 Dipoenura bukolana Barrion, Barrion-Dupo & Heong, 2013 — China
 Dipoenura cyclosoides (Simon, 1895) — Sierra Leone, China, Laos
 Dipoenura fimbriata Simon, 1909 (type) — India, China, Vietnam, Indonesia (Krakatau), Korea, Japan
 Dipoenura quadrifida Simon, 1909 — Vietnam

E

Echinotheridion

Echinotheridion Levi, 1963
 Echinotheridion andresito Ramírez & González, 1999 — Brazil, Argentina
 Echinotheridion cartum Levi, 1963 (type) — Brazil, Paraguay, Argentina
 Echinotheridion elicolum Levi, 1963 — Venezuela
 Echinotheridion gibberosum (Kulczyński, 1899) — Madeira, Canary Is.
 Echinotheridion levii Ramírez & González, 1999 — Brazil
 Echinotheridion lirum Marques & Buckup, 1989 — Brazil
 Echinotheridion otlum Levi, 1963 — Ecuador
 Echinotheridion urarum Buckup & Marques, 1989 — Brazil
 Echinotheridion utibile (Keyserling, 1884) — Brazil

Emertonella

Emertonella Bryant, 1945
 Emertonella emertoni (Bryant, 1933) (type) — USA, Mexico
 Emertonella hainanica Barrion, Barrion-Dupo & Heong, 2013 — China
 Emertonella serrulata Gao & Li, 2014 — China
 Emertonella taczanowskii (Keyserling, 1886) — USA to Argentina. Introduced to India, Sri Lanka, China, Japan (Ryukyu Is.), New Guinea
 Emertonella trachypa Gao & Li, 2014 — China

Enoplognatha

Enoplognatha Pavesi, 1880
 Enoplognatha abrupta (Karsch, 1879) — Russia (Far East), China, Korea, Japan
 Enoplognatha afrodite Hippa & Oksala, 1983 — Southern Europe
 Enoplognatha almeriensis Bosmans & Van Keer, 1999 — Portugal, Spain
 Enoplognatha angkora Barrion, Barrion-Dupo & Heong, 2013 — China
 Enoplognatha apaya Barrion & Litsinger, 1995 — Philippines
 Enoplognatha bidens Simon, 1908 — Australia (Western Australia)
 Enoplognatha biskrensis Denis, 1945 — Morocco, Algeria, Tunisia
 Enoplognatha bobaiensis Zhu, 1998 — China
 Enoplognatha bryjai Řezáč, 2016 — Czech Rep.
 Enoplognatha cariasoi Barrion & Litsinger, 1995 — Philippines
 Enoplognatha caricis (Fickert, 1876) — Europe, Turkey, Russia (Europe to Far East), China, Korea, Japan
 Enoplognatha carinata Bosmans & Van Keer, 1999 — Morocco, Algeria
 Enoplognatha daweiensis Yin & Yan, 2012 — China
 Enoplognatha deserta Levy & Amitai, 1981 — Morocco to Israel
 Enoplognatha diodonta Zhu & Zhang, 1992 — Pakistan, India, China
 Enoplognatha diversa (Blackwall, 1859) — Canary Is., Madeira, Portugal, Spain, France, Morocco to Greece
 Enoplognatha franzi Wunderlich, 1995 — Mediterranean, Iraq
 Enoplognatha fuyangensis Barrion & He, 2017 — China
 Enoplognatha gemina Bosmans & Van Keer, 1999 — Mediterranean to Azerbaijan
 Enoplognatha gershomi Bosmans & Van Keer, 1999 — Israel
 Enoplognatha giladensis (Levy & Amitai, 1982) — Greece (Rhodes), Turkey, Israel, Azerbaijan
 Enoplognatha goulouensis Yin & Yan, 2012 — China
 Enoplognatha gramineusa Zhu, 1998 — China
 Enoplognatha hermani Bosmans & Van Keer, 1999 — Algeria
 Enoplognatha inornata O. Pickard-Cambridge, 1904 — South Africa
 Enoplognatha intrepida (Sørensen, 1898) — USA, Canada, Greenland, Korea
 Enoplognatha iraqi Najim, Al-Hadlak & Seyyar, 2015 — Iraq, Iran
 Enoplognatha joshua Chamberlin & Ivie, 1942 — USA
 Enoplognatha juninensis (Keyserling, 1884) — Peru
 Enoplognatha kalaykayina Barrion & Litsinger, 1995 — Philippines
 Enoplognatha latimana Hippa & Oksala, 1982 — Canada, Europe, North Africa, Turkey, Caucasus, Russia (Europe) to Central Asia
 Enoplognatha lordosa Zhu & Song, 1992 — China, Japan
 Enoplognatha macrochelis Levy & Amitai, 1981 — Macedonia, Greece, Turkey, Cyprus, Israel, Azerbaijan
 Enoplognatha malapahabanda Barrion & Litsinger, 1995 — Philippines
 Enoplognatha mandibularis (Lucas, 1846) (type) — Europe, North Africa, Turkey, Israel, Russia (Europe) to Central Asia, China
 Enoplognatha mangshan Yin, 2012 — China
 Enoplognatha margarita Yaginuma, 1964 — Kazakhstan, Russia (Central Asia to Far East), China, Korea, Japan
 Enoplognatha mariae Bosmans & Van Keer, 1999 — Greece, Russia (Caucasus)
 Enoplognatha maricopa Levi, 1962 — USA
 Enoplognatha marmorata (Hentz, 1850) — North America
 Enoplognatha maysanga Barrion & Litsinger, 1995 — Philippines
 Enoplognatha mediterranea Levy & Amitai, 1981 — Turkey, Cyprus, Israel, Azerbaijan
 Enoplognatha melanicruciata Saito, 1939 — Japan
 Enoplognatha molesta O. Pickard-Cambridge, 1904 — South Africa
 Enoplognatha monstrabilis Marusik & Logunov, 2002 — Russia (south Siberia)
 Enoplognatha mordax (Thorell, 1875) — Europe, North Africa, Turkey, Caucasus, Russia (Europe) to Tajikistan, China
 Enoplognatha nigromarginata (Lucas, 1846) — Spain to Greece, Morocco, Algeria
 Enoplognatha oelandica (Thorell, 1875) — Europe, Caucasus, Kazakhstan, China
 Enoplognatha oreophila (Simon, 1894) — Sri Lanka
 Enoplognatha orientalis Schenkel, 1963 — China
 Enoplognatha ovata (Clerck, 1757) — North America, Europe, Turkey, Caucasus, Russia (Europe to middle Siberia), Central Asia, Japan
 Enoplognatha parathoracica Levy & Amitai, 1981 — Turkey, Israel, Azerbaijan
 Enoplognatha penelope Hippa & Oksala, 1982 — Bulgaria, Greece (incl. Crete)
 Enoplognatha peruviana Chamberlin, 1916 — Peru
 Enoplognatha philippinensis Barrion & Litsinger, 1995 — Philippines
 Enoplognatha procerula Simon, 1909 — South Africa
 Enoplognatha pulatuberculata Barrion & Litsinger, 1995 — Philippines
 Enoplognatha puno Levi, 1962 — Peru
 Enoplognatha qiuae Zhu, 1998 — China
 Enoplognatha quadripunctata Simon, 1884 — Mediterranean, Caucasus, Kazakhstan
 Enoplognatha robusta Thorell, 1898 — Myanmar
 Enoplognatha sattleri Bösenberg, 1895 — Madeira, Salvages, Canary Is.
 Enoplognatha selma Chamberlin & Ivie, 1946 — USA
 Enoplognatha serratosignata (L. Koch, 1879) — Europe, Caucasus, Russia (Europe to Far East), Kazakhstan, China
 Enoplognatha tadzhica Sytshevskaja, 1975 — Tajikistan
 Enoplognatha testacea Simon, 1884 — Southern, Central Europe to Central Asia
 Enoplognatha thoracica (Hahn, 1833) — North America, Europe, Turkey, North Africa, Syria, Iran, Turkmenistan
 Enoplognatha turkestanica Charitonov, 1946 — Iran, Central Asia
 Enoplognatha tuybaana Barrion & Litsinger, 1995 — Philippines
 Enoplognatha verae Bosmans & Van Keer, 1999 — Morocco, Spain, Tunisia, Italy, Greece
 Enoplognatha wyuta Chamberlin & Ivie, 1942 — USA
 Enoplognatha yelpantrapensis Barrion & Litsinger, 1995 — Philippines
 Enoplognatha yizhangensis Yin, 2012 — China
 Enoplognatha zapfeae Levi, 1962 — Chile

Episinus

Episinus Walckenaer, 1809
 Episinus affinis Bösenberg & Strand, 1906 — India, Russia (Far East), Korea, Taiwan, Japan, Ryukyu Is.
 Episinus albostriatus (Simon, 1895) — Peru
 Episinus algiricus Lucas, 1846 — Portugal, Spain, France, Italy, Northwest Africa, Malta?
 Episinus amoenus Banks, 1911 — USA, Mexico
 Episinus angulatus (Blackwall, 1836) — Europe, Turkey, Russia (Europe to west Siberia), Central Asia
 Episinus antipodianus O. Pickard-Cambridge, 1880 — New Zealand
 Episinus aspus Levi, 1964 — Nicaragua
 Episinus bilineatus Simon, 1894 — South Africa
 Episinus bimucronatus (Simon, 1895) — Venezuela
 Episinus bishopi (Lessert, 1929) — Congo
 Episinus cavernicola (Kulczyński, 1897) — Croatia, Slovenia
 Episinus chiapensis Levi, 1955 — Mexico
 Episinus chikunii Yoshida, 1985 — Japan
 Episinus colima Levi, 1955 — Mexico to Panama
 Episinus crysus Buckup & Marques, 1992 — Brazil
 Episinus cuzco Levi, 1967 — Peru
 Episinus dominicus Levi, 1955 — Hispaniola
 Episinus emanus Levi, 1964 — Panama
 Episinus fontinalis Levy, 1985 — Israel
 Episinus garisus Buckup & Marques, 1992 — Brazil
 Episinus gibbus Zhu & Wang, 1995 — China
 Episinus hickmani Caporiacco, 1949 — Kenya
 Episinus immundus (Keyserling, 1884) — Peru, Brazil
 Episinus implexus (Simon, 1894) — Venezuela
 Episinus israeliensis Levy, 1985 — Israel
 Episinus jimmyi Chavari & Brescovit, 2014 — Colombia
 Episinus juarezi Levi, 1955 — Mexico
 Episinus kitazawai Yaginuma, 1958 — Russia (Kurile Is.), Japan
 Episinus longabdomenus Zhu, 1998 — China
 Episinus macrops Simon, 1903 — Equatorial Guinea, Congo
 Episinus maculipes Cavanna, 1876 — Europe, Algeria, Turkey, Caucasus
 Episinus maculipes numidicus Kulczyński, 1905 — Algeria, Tunisia
 Episinus maderianus Kulczyński, 1905 — Canary Is., Madeira
 Episinus makiharai Okuma, 1994 — Taiwan
 Episinus marignaci (Lessert, 1933) — Angola
 Episinus meruensis Tullgren, 1910 — Tanzania
 Episinus moyobamba Levi, 1964 — Peru
 Episinus mucronatus (Simon, 1894) — Singapore
 Episinus nadleri Levi, 1955 — Bahama Is., Jamaica
 Episinus nanyue Yin, 2012 — China
 Episinus nubilus Yaginuma, 1960 — China, Korea, Taiwan, Japan, Ryukyu Is.
 Episinus panamensis Levi, 1955 — Panama
 Episinus pentagonalis Chakrabarti, 2013 — India
 Episinus porteri (Simon, 1901) — Chile, Argentina
 Episinus punctisparsus Yoshida, 1983 — Taiwan
 Episinus pyrus Levi, 1964 — Panama
 Episinus rhomboidalis (Simon, 1895) — Malaysia, Myanmar, Singapore
 Episinus rio Levi, 1967 — Brazil
 Episinus similanus Urquhart, 1893 — New Zealand
 Episinus similitudus Urquhart, 1893 — New Zealand
 Episinus taibeli Caporiacco, 1949 — Ethiopia
 Episinus teresopolis Levi, 1964 — Brazil
 Episinus theridioides Simon, 1873 — Spain, France (mainland, Corsica), Italy (Sardinia)
 Episinus truncatus Latreille, 1809 (type) — Europe, Turkey, Caucasus
 Episinus typicus (Nicolet, 1849) — Chile
 Episinus unitus Levi, 1964 — Cuba, Jamaica
 Episinus variacorneus Chen, Peng & Zhao, 1992 — China
 Episinus vaticus Levi, 1964 — Costa Rica, Panama
 Episinus xiushanicus Zhu, 1998 — China
 Episinus yoshidai Okuma, 1994 — Taiwan
 Episinus zurlus Levi, 1964 — Venezuela

Euryopis

Euryopis Menge, 1868
 Euryopis aeneocincta Simon, 1877 — Philippines
 Euryopis albomaculata Denis, 1951 — Egypt
 Euryopis argentea Emerton, 1882 — USA, Canada, Russia (Kamchatka)
 Euryopis bifascigera Strand, 1913 — Central Africa
 Euryopis californica Banks, 1904 — USA, Mexico
 Euryopis camis Levi, 1963 — Brazil
 Euryopis campestrata Simon, 1907 — Egypt
 Euryopis chatchikovi Ponomarev, 2005 — Russia (Europe)
 Euryopis clara Ponomarev, 2005 — Kazakhstan, Iran
 Euryopis cobreensis Levi, 1963 — Jamaica
 Euryopis coki Levi, 1954 — USA
 Euryopis cyclosisa Zhu & Song, 1997 — China
 Euryopis dentigera Simon, 1880 — France, Italy
 Euryopis deplanata Schenkel, 1936 — China
 Euryopis duodecimguttata Caporiacco, 1950 — Italy
 Euryopis elegans Keyserling, 1890 — Australia
 Euryopis elenae González, 1991 — Argentina
 Euryopis episinoides (Walckenaer, 1847) — Mediterranean to Turkey, Israel. Introduced to Reunion, India, China
 Euryopis estebani González, 1991 — Argentina
 Euryopis flavomaculata (C. L. Koch, 1836) (type) — Europe, Turkey, Caucasus, Russia (Europe to Far East), Kazakhstan, Central Asia, China, Japan
 Euryopis formosa Banks, 1908 — USA, Canada
 Euryopis funebris (Hentz, 1850) — USA, Canada
 Euryopis galeiforma Zhu, 1998 — China
 Euryopis gertschi Levi, 1951 — USA, Canada
 Euryopis giordanii Caporiacco, 1950 — Italy
 Euryopis hebraea Levy & Amitai, 1981 — Israel
 Euryopis helcra Roberts, 1983 — Seychelles (Aldabra)
 Euryopis iharai Yoshida, 1992 — Japan, Ryukyu Is.
 Euryopis jucunda Thorell, 1895 — Myanmar
 Euryopis laeta (Westring, 1861) — Europe, Tunisia, Turkey, Caucasus, Russia (Europe to south Siberia), Kazakhstan, Central Asia
 Euryopis levii Heimer, 1987 — Mongolia
 Euryopis lineatipes O. Pickard-Cambridge, 1893 — USA to Colombia
 Euryopis maga Simon, 1908 — Australia (Western Australia)
 Euryopis margaritata (L. Koch, 1867) — Italy, Greece
 Euryopis megalops (Caporiacco, 1934) — Karakorum
 Euryopis mingyaoi Yin, 2012 — China
 Euryopis molopica Thorell, 1895 — Myanmar
 Euryopis mulaiki Levi, 1954 — USA, Mexico
 Euryopis multipunctata (Simon, 1895) — Australia (Victoria)
 Euryopis mutoloi Caporiacco, 1948 — Greece
 Euryopis nana (O. Pickard-Cambridge, 1880) — New Zealand
 Euryopis nigra Yoshida, 2000 — Japan
 Euryopis notabilis (Keyserling, 1891) — Brazil
 Euryopis nubila Simon, 1889 — India
 Euryopis octomaculata (Paik, 1995) — Korea, Japan
 Euryopis orsovensis Kulczyński, 1894 — Hungary, Turkey
 Euryopis pepini Levi, 1954 — USA
 Euryopis perpusilla Ono, 2011 — Japan
 Euryopis petricola (Hickman, 1951) — Australia (Tasmania)
 Euryopis pickardi Levi, 1963 — Jamaica, Panama to Peru
 Euryopis pilosa Miller, 1970 — Angola
 Euryopis potteri Simon, 1901 — Ethiopia
 Euryopis praemitis Simon, 1909 — Vietnam
 Euryopis promo González, 1991 — Argentina
 Euryopis quinqueguttata Thorell, 1875 — Europe, Egypt, Caucasus, Turkmenistan
 Euryopis quinquemaculata Banks, 1900 — USA
 Euryopis sagittata (O. Pickard-Cambridge, 1885) — China (Yarkand)
 Euryopis saukea Levi, 1951 — North America, Europe, Russia (Europe to Far East), Azerbaijan, Kazakhstan
 Euryopis scriptipes Banks, 1908 — North America
 Euryopis sexalbomaculata (Lucas, 1846) — Mediterranean, Ukraine, Russia (Caucasus), Iran
 Euryopis sexmaculata Hu, 2001 — China
 Euryopis spinifera (Mello-Leitão, 1944) — Argentina
 Euryopis spinigera O. Pickard-Cambridge, 1895 — USA to Colombia
 Euryopis spiritus Levi, 1954 — USA
 Euryopis splendens (Rainbow, 1916) — Australia (New South Wales)
 Euryopis splendida (Simon, 1889) — New Caledonia
 Euryopis superba (Rainbow, 1896) — Australia (New South Wales, Victoria)
 Euryopis talaveraensis González, 1991 — Argentina
 Euryopis tavara Levi, 1954 — USA
 Euryopis texana Banks, 1908 — USA, Mexico
 Euryopis tribulata Simon, 1905 — Argentina
 Euryopis umbilicata L. Koch, 1872 — Australia
 Euryopis varis Levi, 1963 — USA
 Euryopis venutissima (Caporiacco, 1934) — Karakorum
 Euryopis weesei Levi, 1963 — USA

Eurypoena

Eurypoena Wunderlich, 1992
 Eurypoena tuberosa (Wunderlich, 1987) (type) — Canary Is.
 Eurypoena tuberosa alegranzaensis Wunderlich, 1992 — Canary Is.

Exalbidion

Exalbidion Wunderlich, 1995
 Exalbidion barroanum (Levi, 1959) — Panama, Ecuador
 Exalbidion dotanum (Banks, 1914) — Mexico to Panama
 Exalbidion fungosum (Keyserling, 1886) — Venezuela, Ecuador, Peru, Brazil, Argentina
 Exalbidion pallisterorum (Levi, 1959) — Mexico
 Exalbidion rufipunctum (Levi, 1959) — Panama, Ecuador
 Exalbidion sexmaculatum (Keyserling, 1884) (type) — Guatemala, Caribbean to Brazil

F

Faiditus

Faiditus Keyserling, 1884
 Faiditus acuminatus (Keyserling, 1891) — Brazil, Argentina
 Faiditus affinis (O. Pickard-Cambridge, 1880) — Brazil
 Faiditus alticeps (Keyserling, 1891) — Brazil, Paraguay
 Faiditus altus (Keyserling, 1891) — Venezuela, Brazil
 Faiditus amates (Exline & Levi, 1962) — Mexico, Guatemala
 Faiditus americanus (Taczanowski, 1874) — USA to Brazil, Argentina
 Faiditus amplifrons (O. Pickard-Cambridge, 1880) — Panama to Argentina
 Faiditus analiae (González & Carmen, 1996) — Brazil
 Faiditus arthuri (Exline & Levi, 1962) — Panama
 Faiditus atopus (Chamberlin & Ivie, 1936) — Panama to Ecuador
 Faiditus bryantae (Exline & Levi, 1962) — Costa Rica, Panama
 Faiditus cancellatus (Hentz, 1850) — USA, Canada, Bahama Is.
 Faiditus caronae (González & Carmen, 1996) — Brazil
 Faiditus caudatus (Taczanowski, 1874) — USA, Caribbean to Argentina
 Faiditus chicaensis (González & Carmen, 1996) — Argentina
 Faiditus chickeringi (Exline & Levi, 1962) — Panama
 Faiditus cochleaformus (Exline, 1945) — Ecuador, Peru
 Faiditus convolutus (Exline & Levi, 1962) — Guatemala to Peru, Brazil
 Faiditus cordillera (Exline, 1945) — Ecuador
 Faiditus cristinae (González & Carmen, 1996) — Brazil
 Faiditus cubensis (Exline & Levi, 1962) — Cuba
 Faiditus darlingtoni (Exline & Levi, 1962) — Jamaica, Hispaniola
 Faiditus davisi (Exline & Levi, 1962) — USA, Mexico
 Faiditus dracus (Chamberlin & Ivie, 1936) — USA to Paraguay
 Faiditus duckensis (González & Carmen, 1996) — Brazil
 Faiditus ecaudatus Keyserling, 1884 (type) — Brazil
 Faiditus exiguus (Exline & Levi, 1962) — Cuba, Puerto Rico
 Faiditus fulvus (Exline & Levi, 1962) — Brazil
 Faiditus gapensis (Exline & Levi, 1962) — Jamaica
 Faiditus gertschi (Exline & Levi, 1962) — Panama
 Faiditus globosus (Keyserling, 1884) — USA to Ecuador
 Faiditus godmani (Exline & Levi, 1962) — Guatemala
 Faiditus iguazuensis (González & Carmen, 1996) — Argentina
 Faiditus jamaicensis (Exline & Levi, 1962) — Jamaica
 Faiditus laraensis (González & Carmen, 1996) — Argentina
 Faiditus leonensis (Exline & Levi, 1962) — Mexico
 Faiditus maculosus (O. Pickard-Cambridge, 1898) — USA, Mexico
 Faiditus mariae (González & Carmen, 1996) — Argentina
 Faiditus morretensis (González & Carmen, 1996) — Brazil, Argentina
 Faiditus nataliae (González & Carmen, 1996) — Argentina
 Faiditus peruensis (Exline & Levi, 1962) — Peru
 Faiditus plaumanni (Exline & Levi, 1962) — Brazil
 Faiditus proboscifer (Exline, 1945) — Ecuador, Peru
 Faiditus quasiobtusus (Exline & Levi, 1962) — Puerto Rico, Virgin Is.
 Faiditus rossi (Exline & Levi, 1962) — Colombia
 Faiditus sicki (Exline & Levi, 1962) — Brazil
 Faiditus solidao (Levi, 1967) — Brazil
 Faiditus spinosus (Keyserling, 1884) — Venezuela, Peru
 Faiditus striatus (Keyserling, 1891) — Brazil
 Faiditus subdolus (O. Pickard-Cambridge, 1898) — USA to Guatemala
 Faiditus subflavus (Exline & Levi, 1962) — Peru
 Faiditus sullana (Exline, 1945) — Peru
 Faiditus taeter (Exline & Levi, 1962) — Mexico
 Faiditus ululans (O. Pickard-Cambridge, 1880) — Mexico to Brazil
 Faiditus vadoensis (González & Carmen, 1996) — Argentina
 Faiditus woytkowskii (Exline & Levi, 1962) — Peru
 Faiditus xiphias (Thorell, 1887) — Myanmar, India (Nicobar Is.) to Japan, Indonesia (Krakatau)
 Faiditus yacuiensis (González & Carmen, 1996) — Argentina
 Faiditus yutoensis (González & Carmen, 1996) — Argentina

G

Gmogala

Gmogala Keyserling, 1890
 Gmogala scarabaeus Keyserling, 1890 (type) — New Guinea, Australia

Grancanaridion

Grancanaridion Wunderlich, 2011
 Grancanaridion grancanariense (Wunderlich, 1987) (type) — Canary Is.

Guaraniella

Guaraniella Baert, 1984
 Guaraniella bracata Baert, 1984 — Brazil, Paraguay
 Guaraniella mahnerti Baert, 1984 (type) — Brazil, Paraguay

H

Hadrotarsus

Hadrotarsus Thorell, 1881
 Hadrotarsus babirussa Thorell, 1881 (type) — New Guinea
 Hadrotarsus fulvus Hickman, 1943 — Australia (Tasmania)
 Hadrotarsus ornatus Hickman, 1943 — Australia (Tasmania). Introduced to Belgium
 Hadrotarsus setosus Hickman, 1943 — Australia (Tasmania)
 Hadrotarsus yamius Wang, 1955 — Taiwan

Helvibis

Helvibis Keyserling, 1884
 Helvibis brasiliana (Keyserling, 1884) — Peru
 Helvibis chilensis (Keyserling, 1884) — Chile, Brazil
 Helvibis germaini Simon, 1895 — Peru, Brazil
 Helvibis infelix (O. Pickard-Cambridge, 1880) — Brazil
 Helvibis longicauda Keyserling, 1891 — Brazil
 Helvibis longistyla (F. O. Pickard-Cambridge, 1902) — Panama, Trinidad
 Helvibis monticola Keyserling, 1891 — Brazil
 Helvibis rossi Levi, 1964 — Peru
 Helvibis thorelli Keyserling, 1884 (type) — Peru, Brazil
 Helvibis tingo Levi, 1964 — Peru

Helvidia

Helvidia Thorell, 1890
 Helvidia scabricula Thorell, 1890 (type) — Indonesia (Sumatra)

Hentziectypus

Hentziectypus Archer, 1946
 Hentziectypus annus (Levi, 1959) — Jamaica, Bermuda
 Hentziectypus apex (Levi, 1959) — Panama
 Hentziectypus conjunctus (Gertsch & Mulaik, 1936) — USA, Canada
 Hentziectypus florendidus (Levi, 1959) — USA to Venezuela
 Hentziectypus florens (O. Pickard-Cambridge, 1896) — USA to Panama, Cuba
 Hentziectypus globosus (Hentz, 1850) (type) — North America
 Hentziectypus hermosillo (Levi, 1959) — Mexico
 Hentziectypus rafaeli (Buckup & Marques, 1991) — Bolivia, Brazil
 Hentziectypus schullei (Gertsch & Mulaik, 1936) — USA, Mexico
 Hentziectypus serax (Levi, 1959) — Mexico
 Hentziectypus tayrona Buckup, Marques & Rodrigues, 2012 — Colombia
 Hentziectypus turquino (Levi, 1959) — Cuba

Heterotheridion

Heterotheridion Wunderlich, 2008
 Heterotheridion nigrovariegatum (Simon, 1873) (type) — Europe, Turkey, Caucasus, Russia (Europe) to Central Asia, China

Hetschkia

Hetschkia Keyserling, 1886
 Hetschkia gracilis Keyserling, 1886 (type) — Brazil

Histagonia

Histagonia Simon, 1895
 Histagonia deserticola Simon, 1895 (type) — South Africa

I

Icona

Icona Forster, 1955
 Icona alba Forster, 1955 (type) — New Zealand (Auckland Is., Campbell Is.)
 Icona drama Forster, 1964 — New Zealand (Auckland Is.)

J

Jamaitidion

Jamaitidion Wunderlich, 1995
 Jamaitidion jamaicense (Levi, 1959) (type) — Jamaica

Janula

Janula Strand, 1932
 Janula batman Yoshida & Koh, 2011 — Borneo
 Janula bicorniger (Simon, 1894) — Brazil
 Janula bicornis (Thorell, 1881) (type) — Australia (Queensland)
 Janula bicruciata (Simon, 1895) — Brazil
 Janula bifrons (Thorell, 1895) — Myanmar
 Janula bizona Yoshida & Koh, 2011 — Borneo
 Janula bruneiensis Yoshida & Koh, 2011 — Borneo
 Janula bubalis Yoshida & Koh, 2011 — Borneo
 Janula erythrophthalma (Simon, 1894) — Panama, Lesser Antilles to Bolivia
 Janula luteolimbata (Thorell, 1898) — Myanmar
 Janula malachina (Simon, 1895) — Peru
 Janula marginata (Thorell, 1898) — Myanmar
 Janula modesta (Thorell, 1898) — Myanmar
 Janula nebulosa (Simon, 1895) — Brazil, Paraguay
 Janula ocreata (Simon, 1909) — Vietnam
 Janula parva (Wunderlich, 2008) — Malaysia
 Janula picta (Simon, 1895) — Singapore
 Janula salobrensis (Simon, 1895) — Trinidad, Brazil, Guyana
 Janula taprobanica (Simon, 1895) — Sri Lanka
 Janula triangularis Yoshida & Koh, 2011 — Singapore, Indonesia (Borneo)
 Janula triocellata Yoshida & Koh, 2011 — Borneo

K

Keijiella

Keijiella Yoshida, 2016
 Keijiella oculiprominens (Saito, 1939) (type) — China, Taiwan, Laos, Korea, Japan

Kochiura

Kochiura Archer, 1950
 Kochiura attrita (Nicolet, 1849) — Chile, Juan Fernandez Is.
 Kochiura aulica (C. L. Koch, 1838) (type) — Cape Verde Is., Canary Is., North Africa, Europe, Turkey, Caucasus
 Kochiura casablanca (Levi, 1963) — Chile
 Kochiura decolorata (Keyserling, 1886) — Brazil
 Kochiura ocellata (Nicolet, 1849) — Chile
 Kochiura olaup (Levi, 1963) — Brazil
 Kochiura rosea (Nicolet, 1849) — Chile, Juan Fernandez Is.
 Kochiura temuco (Levi, 1963) — Chile

L

Landoppo

Landoppo Barrion & Litsinger, 1995
 Landoppo misamisoriensis Barrion & Litsinger, 1995 (type) — Philippines

Lasaeola

Lasaeola Simon, 1881
 Lasaeola algarvensis Wunderlich, 2011 — Portugal
 Lasaeola armona Wunderlich, 2015 — Portugal, Spain
 Lasaeola atopa (Chamberlin, 1949) — USA
 Lasaeola bequaerti (Chickering, 1948) — Panama
 Lasaeola canariensis (Wunderlich, 1987) — Canary Is.
 Lasaeola convexa (Blackwall, 1870) — Mediterranean
 Lasaeola coracina (C. L. Koch, 1837) — Western Europe to Ukraine
 Lasaeola dbari Kovblyuk, Marusik & Omelko, 2012 — Georgia
 Lasaeola donaldi (Chickering, 1943) — Panama, Venezuela
 Lasaeola fastigata Zhang, Liu & Zhang, 2011 — China
 Lasaeola flavitarsis (Wunderlich, 1992) — Canary Is.
 Lasaeola grancanariensis (Wunderlich, 1987) — Canary Is.
 Lasaeola lunata Zhang, Liu & Zhang, 2011 — China
 Lasaeola minutissima Wunderlich, 2011 — Portugal, Spain
 Lasaeola oceanica Simon, 1883 — Azores
 Lasaeola okinawana (Yoshida & Ono, 2000) — China, Japan (Ryukyu Is.)
 Lasaeola prona (Menge, 1868) (type) — North America, Europe, Caucasus, Russia (Europe to south Siberia), Japan
 Lasaeola spinithorax (Keyserling, 1886) — Peru
 Lasaeola striata (Wunderlich, 1987) — Canary Is.
 Lasaeola superba (Chickering, 1948) — Mexico, Panama
 Lasaeola testaceomarginata Simon, 1881 — Mediterranean
 Lasaeola tristis (Hahn, 1833) — Europe, Turkey, Russia (Europe to south Siberia), Central Asia
 Lasaeola tristis hissariensis (Charitonov, 1951) — Russia (south Siberia)
 Lasaeola yona (Yoshida & Ono, 2000) — Japan (Ryukyu Is.)
 Lasaeola yoshidai (Ono, 1991) — China, Korea, Japan

Latrodectus

Latrodectus Walckenaer, 1805
 Latrodectus antheratus (Badcock, 1932) — Paraguay, Argentina
 Latrodectus apicalis Butler, 1877 — Ecuador (Galapagos Is.)
 Latrodectus bishopi Kaston, 1938 — USA
 Latrodectus cinctus Blackwall, 1865 — Cape Verde Is., Africa, Kuwait, Iran
 Latrodectus corallinus Abalos, 1980 — Argentina
 Latrodectus curacaviensis (Müller, 1776) — Lesser Antilles, South America
 Latrodectus dahli Levi, 1959 — North Africa, Turkey, Azerbaijan, Kazakhstan, Central Asia
 Latrodectus diaguita Carcavallo, 1960 — Argentina
 Latrodectus elegans Thorell, 1898 — India, Myanmar, China, Japan
 Latrodectus erythromelas Schmidt & Klaas, 1991 — India, Sri Lanka
 Latrodectus geometricus C. L. Koch, 1841 — Africa. Introduced to both Americas, Poland, Middle East, Pakistan, India, Thailand, Japan, Papua New Guinea, Australia, Hawaii
 Latrodectus hasselti Thorell, 1870 — India, Southeast Asia to Australia, New Zealand
 Latrodectus hesperus Chamberlin & Ivie, 1935 — North America. Introduced to Israel
 Latrodectus hystrix Simon, 1890 — Yemen (mainland, Socotra)
 Latrodectus indistinctus O. Pickard-Cambridge, 1904 — Namibia, South Africa
 Latrodectus karrooensis Smithers, 1944 — South Africa
 Latrodectus katipo Powell, 1871 — New Zealand
 Latrodectus lilianae Melic, 2000 — Spain, Algeria
 Latrodectus mactans (Fabricius, 1775) — Probably native to North America only. Introduced to South America, Asia
 Latrodectus menavodi Vinson, 1863 — Madagascar, Comoros, Seychelles (Aldabra)
 Latrodectus mirabilis (Holmberg, 1876) — Argentina
 Latrodectus obscurior Dahl, 1902 — Cape Verde Is., Madagascar
 Latrodectus pallidus O. Pickard-Cambridge, 1872 — Cape Verde Is. to Libya, Turkey, Kazakhstan, Central Asia
 Latrodectus quartus Abalos, 1980 — Argentina
 Latrodectus renivulvatus Dahl, 1902 — Africa, Yemen, Saudi Arabia, Iraq
 Latrodectus revivensis Shulov, 1948 — Israel, Canary Is.?
 Latrodectus rhodesiensis Mackay, 1972 — Southern Africa
 Latrodectus thoracicus Nicolet, 1849 — Chile
 Latrodectus tredecimguttatus (Rossi, 1790) (type) — Mediterranea, Ukraine, Caucasus, Russia (Europe to south Siberia), Kazakhstan, Central Asia, China
 Latrodectus variegatus Nicolet, 1849 — Chile, Argentina
 Latrodectus variolus Walckenaer, 1837 — USA, Canada

M

Macaridion

Macaridion Wunderlich, 1992
 Macaridion barreti (Kulczyński, 1899) (type) — Canary Is., Madeira

Magnopholcomma

Magnopholcomma Wunderlich, 2008
 Magnopholcomma globulus Wunderlich, 2008 (type) — Australia (Queensland)

Meotipa

Meotipa Simon, 1894
 Meotipa andamanensis (Tikader, 1977) — India (Andaman Is.)
 Meotipa argyrodiformis (Yaginuma, 1952) — China, Japan, Philippines, India
 Meotipa bituberculata Deeleman-Reinhold, 2009 — Indonesia (Sumatra, Java)
 Meotipa impatiens Deeleman-Reinhold, 2009 — Malaysia, Indonesia (Sumatra, Borneo)
 Meotipa makiling (Barrion-Dupo & Barrion, 2015) — Philippines
 Meotipa multuma Murthappa, Malamel, Prajapati, Sebastian & Venkateshwarlu, 2017 — India
 Meotipa pallida Deeleman-Reinhold, 2009 — Indonesia (Sumatra, Borneo)
 Meotipa picturata Simon, 1895 (type) — India, Thailand, Laos, Indonesia
 Meotipa pulcherrima (Mello-Leitão, 1917) — Tropical Africa. Introduced to the Americas, Papua New Guinea, China, Korea, Japan, Pacific Is.
 Meotipa sahyadri Kulkarni, Vartak, Deshpande & Halali, 2017 — India
 Meotipa spiniventris (O. Pickard-Cambridge, 1869) — Sri Lanka to Taiwan, China, Japan. Introduced to the Netherlands
 Meotipa thalerorum Deeleman-Reinhold, 2009 — Malaysia, Indonesia (Sumatra, Java)
 Meotipa vesiculosa Simon, 1895 — China, Vietnam to Japan, Philippines, Indonesia

Molione

Molione Thorell, 1892
 Molione christae Yoshida, 2003 — Borneo
 Molione kinabalu Yoshida, 2003 — China, Borneo
 Molione lemboda Gao & Li, 2010 — China
 Molione triacantha Thorell, 1892 (type) — India, China, Laos, Malaysia, Singapore, Taiwan
 Molione trispinosa (O. Pickard-Cambridge, 1873) — Sri Lanka
 Molione uniacantha Wunderlich, 1995 — Malaysia, Indonesia (Sumatra)

Moneta

Moneta O. Pickard-Cambridge, 1871
 Moneta australis (Keyserling, 1890) — Australia (Queensland)
 Moneta baoae Yin, 2012 — China
 Moneta caudifera (Dönitz & Strand, 1906) — Russia (Far East), China, Korea, Japan
 Moneta coercervea (Roberts, 1978) — Seychelles
 Moneta conifera (Urquhart, 1887) — New Zealand
 Moneta furva Yin, 2012 — China
 Moneta grandis Simon, 1905 — India
 Moneta hunanica Zhu, 1998 — China
 Moneta longicauda Simon, 1908 — Australia (Western Australia)
 Moneta mirabilis (Bösenberg & Strand, 1906) — China, Korea, Laos, Malaysia, Taiwan, Japan
 Moneta orientalis Simon, 1909 — Vietnam
 Moneta spinigera O. Pickard-Cambridge, 1871 (type) — Africa, Asia
 Moneta spinigeroides (Zhu & Song, 1992) — China
 Moneta subspinigera Zhu, 1998 — China
 Moneta tanikawai (Yoshida, 1991) — Japan
 Moneta triquetra Simon, 1889 — New Caledonia
 Moneta tumida Zhu, 1998 — China
 Moneta tumulicola Zhu, 1998 — China
 Moneta uncinata Zhu, 1998 — China
 Moneta variabilis Rainbow, 1920 — Australia (Lord Howe Is.)
 Moneta yoshimurai (Yoshida, 1983) — Taiwan

Montanidion

Montanidion Wunderlich, 2011
 Montanidion kuantanense Wunderlich, 2011 (type) — Malaysia

N

Nanume

Nanume Saaristo, 2006
 Nanume naneum (Roberts, 1983) (type) — Seychelles (Aldabra)

Neopisinus

Neopisinus Marques, Buckup & Rodrigues, 2011
 Neopisinus bigibbosus (O. Pickard-Cambridge, 1896) — Panama
 Neopisinus bruneoviridis (Mello-Leitão, 1948) — Panama, Trinidad to Brazil
 Neopisinus cognatus (O. Pickard-Cambridge, 1893) — USA to Peru, Brazil
 Neopisinus fiapo Marques, Buckup & Rodrigues, 2011 (type) — Brazil
 Neopisinus gratiosus (Bryant, 1940) — Cuba, Hispaniola
 Neopisinus longipes (Keyserling, 1884) — Peru, Brazil
 Neopisinus putus (O. Pickard-Cambridge, 1894) — Mexico to Panama
 Neopisinus recifensis (Levi, 1964) — Brazil
 Neopisinus urucu Marques, Buckup & Rodrigues, 2011 — Brazil

Neospintharus

Neospintharus Exline, 1950
 Neospintharus baboquivari (Exline & Levi, 1962) — USA, Mexico
 Neospintharus baekamensis Seo, 2010 — Korea
 Neospintharus bicornis (O. Pickard-Cambridge, 1880) — Brazil
 Neospintharus concisus (Exline & Levi, 1962) — Mexico
 Neospintharus fur (Bösenberg & Strand, 1906) — China, Korea, Japan
 Neospintharus furcatus (O. Pickard-Cambridge, 1894) — USA to El Salvador, Caribbean
 Neospintharus nipponicus (Kumada, 1990) — China, Korea, Japan
 Neospintharus obscurus (Keyserling, 1884) — Peru
 Neospintharus parvus Exline, 1950 (type) — Panama to Ecuador
 Neospintharus rioensis (Exline & Levi, 1962) — Brazil, Argentina
 Neospintharus syriacus (O. Pickard-Cambridge, 1872) — Turkey, Lebanon, Israel
 Neospintharus triangularis (Taczanowski, 1873) — Panama, French Guiana
 Neospintharus trigonum (Hentz, 1850) — USA, Canada

Neottiura

Neottiura Menge, 1868
 Neottiura bimaculata (Linnaeus, 1767) (type) — North America, Europe, Turkey, Caucasus, Russia (Europe to Far East), Central Asia, China, Japan
 Neottiura bimaculata pellucida (Simon, 1873) — Spain, France, Italy
 Neottiura curvimana (Simon, 1914) — Portugal, Spain, France, Algeria
 Neottiura herbigrada (Simon, 1873) — Madeira, Mediterranean, Ukraine, China, Korea
 Neottiura margarita (Yoshida, 1985) — Russia (Far East), China, Korea, Japan
 Neottiura suaveolens (Simon, 1880) — Europe
 Neottiura uncinata (Lucas, 1846) — Mediterranean

Nesopholcomma

Nesopholcomma Ono, 2010
 Nesopholcomma izuense Ono, 2010 (type) — Japan

Nesticodes

Nesticodes Archer, 1950
 Nesticodes rufipes (Lucas, 1846) (type) — Central and South America. Introduced to Europe, Macaronesia, North Africa, Middle East, China, Japan, Sri Lanka, Indonesia, New Zealand, Pacific Is.

Nihonhimea

Nihonhimea Yoshida, 2016
 Nihonhimea japonica (Bösenberg & Strand, 1906) (type) — China, Laos, Taiwan, Korea, Japan
 Nihonhimea mundula (L. Koch, 1872) — Seychelles, India to New Caledonia
 Nihonhimea mundula papuana (Chrysanthus, 1963) — New Guinea
 Nihonhimea tesselata (Keyserling, 1884) — Mexico to Paraguay. Introduced to Pakistan, New Guinea, Australia (Queensland)

Nipponidion

Nipponidion Yoshida, 2001
 Nipponidion okinawense Yoshida, 2001 (type) — Japan (Okinawa)
 Nipponidion yaeyamense (Yoshida, 1993) — Japan

Nojimaia

Nojimaia Yoshida, 2009
 Nojimaia nipponica Yoshida, 2009 (type) — China, Japan

O

Ohlertidion

Ohlertidion Wunderlich, 2008
 Ohlertidion lundbecki (Sørensen, 1898) — Greenland
 Ohlertidion ohlerti (Thorell, 1870) (type) — North America, Europe, Russia (Europe to Far East)
 Ohlertidion thaleri (Marusik, 1988) — Russia (northeastern Siberia, Far East)

Okumaella

Okumaella Yoshida, 2009
 Okumaella okumae (Yoshida, 1988) (type) — Japan

P

Paidiscura

Paidiscura Archer, 1950
 Paidiscura dromedaria (Simon, 1880) — Cape Verde Is., Spain, France, Italy, Greece, North Africa to Middle East
 Paidiscura orotavensis (Schmidt, 1968) — Canary Is., Madeira
 Paidiscura pallens (Blackwall, 1834) (type) — Europe, Algeria, Turkey, Georgia, Russia (Europe to south Siberia)
 Paidiscura subpallens (Bösenberg & Strand, 1906) — China, Korea, Japan

Parasteatoda

Parasteatoda Archer, 1946
 Parasteatoda aequipeiformis Yang, Irfan & Peng, 2019 — China
 Parasteatoda angulithorax (Bösenberg & Strand, 1906) — Russia (Far East), China, Korea, Japan
 Parasteatoda asiatica (Bösenberg & Strand, 1906) — China, Korea, Japan
 Parasteatoda brookesiana (Barrion & Litsinger, 1995) — India, Philippines
 Parasteatoda camura (Simon, 1877) — Philippines, New Guinea, Solomon Is.
 Parasteatoda celsabdomina (Zhu, 1998) — India, China, Thailand, Laos
 Parasteatoda cingulata (Zhu, 1998) — China
 Parasteatoda corrugata Yoshida, 2016 — Japan
 Parasteatoda culicivora (Bösenberg & Strand, 1906) — China, Japan
 Parasteatoda daliensis (Zhu, 1998) — China, Laos
 Parasteatoda decorata (L. Koch, 1867) — Indonesia (Krakatau), New Guinea, Australia (Queensland)
 Parasteatoda ducta (Zhu, 1998) — China
 Parasteatoda galeiforma (Zhu, Zhang & Xu, 1991) — China
 Parasteatoda gui (Zhu, 1998) — China
 Parasteatoda hammeni (Chrysanthus, 1963) — New Guinea
 Parasteatoda hatsushibai Yoshida, 2009 — Japan
 Parasteatoda jinghongensis (Zhu, 1998) — China
 Parasteatoda kaindi (Levi, Lubin & Robinson, 1982) — New Guinea
 Parasteatoda kentingensis Yoshida, 2015 — Taiwan
 Parasteatoda kompirensis (Bösenberg & Strand, 1906) — India, China, Korea, Japan
 Parasteatoda lanyuensis (Yoshida, Tso & Severinghaus, 2000) — Taiwan
 Parasteatoda longiducta (Zhu, 1998) — China
 Parasteatoda lunata (Clerck, 1757) — Europe, Turkey, Israel, Caucasus, Russia (Europe to Far East)
 Parasteatoda lunata serrata (Franganillo, 1930) — Cuba
 Parasteatoda merapiensis Yoshida & Takasuka, 2011 — Indonesia (Java)
 Parasteatoda nigrovittata (Keyserling, 1884) — Mexico to Argentina
 Parasteatoda oxymaculata (Zhu, 1998) — China, India, Laos
 Parasteatoda palmata Gao & Li, 2014 — China
 Parasteatoda polygramma (Kulczyński, 1911) — New Guinea
 Parasteatoda quadrimaculata (Yoshida, Tso & Severinghaus, 2000) — Taiwan
 Parasteatoda ryukyu (Yoshida, 2000) — Japan, Ryukyu Is., Taiwan
 Parasteatoda simulans (Thorell, 1875) — Europe, Turkey, Caucasus, Russia (Europe to south Siberia)
 Parasteatoda songi (Zhu, 1998) — China
 Parasteatoda subtabulata (Zhu, 1998) — China
 Parasteatoda subvexa (Zhu, 1998) — China
 Parasteatoda tabulata (Levi, 1980) — Tropical Asia. Introduced to North America, Europe, Georgia, Russia (Europe to Far East), Central Asia, China, Korea, Japan
 Parasteatoda taiwanica Yoshida, 2015 — Taiwan
 Parasteatoda tepidariorum (C. L. Koch, 1841) (type) — South America. Introduced to Canada, USA, Seychelles, Europe, Turkey, Caucasis, Russia (Europe to Far East), Central Asia, China, Japan, New Zealand, Hawaii
 Parasteatoda tepidariorum australis (Thorell, 1895) — Myanmar
 Parasteatoda transipora (Zhu & Zhang, 1992) — China
 Parasteatoda triangula (Yoshida, 1993) — Singapore, Indonesia (Java, Bali)
 Parasteatoda valoka (Chrysanthus, 1975) — New Guinea, Papua New Guinea (New Britain)
 Parasteatoda vervoorti (Chrysanthus, 1975) — New Guinea
 Parasteatoda wangi Jin & Zhang, 2013 — China
 Parasteatoda wau (Levi, Lubin & Robinson, 1982) — New Guinea

Paratheridula

Paratheridula Levi, 1957
 Paratheridula perniciosa (Keyserling, 1886) (type) — USA to Chile

Pholcomma

Pholcomma Thorell, 1869
 Pholcomma antipodianum (Forster, 1955) — New Zealand (Antipodes Is.)
 Pholcomma barnesi Levi, 1957 — USA
 Pholcomma carota Levi, 1957 — USA
 Pholcomma gibbum (Westring, 1851) (type) — Europe, North Africa, Turkey, Azerbaijan
 Pholcomma hickmani Forster, 1964 — New Zealand (Campbell Is.)
 Pholcomma hirsutum Emerton, 1882 — USA, Canada
 Pholcomma mantinum Levi, 1964 — Brazil
 Pholcomma micropunctatum (Mello-Leitão, 1941) — Argentina
 Pholcomma soloa (Marples, 1955) — Samoa, Niue
 Pholcomma tokyoense Ono, 2007 — Japan
 Pholcomma turbotti (Marples, 1956) — New Zealand

Phoroncidia

Phoroncidia Westwood, 1835
 Phoroncidia aciculata Thorell, 1877 — Indonesia (Sulawesi)
 Phoroncidia aculeata Westwood, 1835 (type) — India, China
 Phoroncidia alishanensis Chen, 1990 — Taiwan
 Phoroncidia altiventris Yoshida, 1985 — Japan
 Phoroncidia alveolata (Simon, 1903) — Equatorial Guinea
 Phoroncidia ambatolahy Kariko, 2014 — Madagascar
 Phoroncidia americana (Emerton, 1882) — USA, Canada, Cuba, Jamaica
 Phoroncidia argoides (Doleschall, 1857) — Indonesia (Ambon)
 Phoroncidia aurata O. Pickard-Cambridge, 1877 — Madagascar
 Phoroncidia bifrons (Simon, 1895) — Philippines
 Phoroncidia biocellata (Simon, 1893) — Brazil
 Phoroncidia bukolana Barrion & Litsinger, 1995 — Philippines
 Phoroncidia capensis (Simon, 1895) — South Africa
 Phoroncidia concave Yin & Xu, 2012 — China
 Phoroncidia coracina (Simon, 1899) — Indonesia (Sumatra)
 Phoroncidia cribrata (Simon, 1893) — Paraguay
 Phoroncidia crustula Zhu, 1998 — China
 Phoroncidia cygnea (Hickman, 1951) — Australia (Tasmania)
 Phoroncidia eburnea (Simon, 1895) — South Africa
 Phoroncidia ellenbergeri Berland, 1913 — Gabon
 Phoroncidia escalerai (Simon, 1903) — Equatorial Guinea
 Phoroncidia flavolimbata (Simon, 1893) — Ecuador
 Phoroncidia floripara Gao & Li, 2014 — China
 Phoroncidia fumosa (Nicolet, 1849) — Chile
 Phoroncidia gayi (Nicolet, 1849) — Chile
 Phoroncidia gira Levi, 1964 — Venezuela
 Phoroncidia hankiewiczi (Kulczyński, 1911) — Portugal, Spain, France
 Phoroncidia hexacantha Thorell, 1890 — Indonesia (Sumatra)
 Phoroncidia jacobsoni (Reimoser, 1925) — Indonesia (Sumatra)
 Phoroncidia kibonotensis (Tullgren, 1910) — East Africa
 Phoroncidia kibonotensis concolor (Caporiacco, 1949) — Kenya
 Phoroncidia levii Chrysanthus, 1963 — New Guinea
 Phoroncidia longiceps (Keyserling, 1886) — Brazil
 Phoroncidia lygeana (Walckenaer, 1841) — Malaysia, Indonesia (Sumatra, Java, Borneo)
 Phoroncidia maindroni (Simon, 1905) — India
 Phoroncidia minuta (Spassky, 1932) — Georgia, Azerbaijan
 Phoroncidia moyobamba Levi, 1964 — Peru, Brazil
 Phoroncidia musiva (Simon, 1880) — New Caledonia
 Phoroncidia nasuta (O. Pickard-Cambridge, 1873) — Sri Lanka, Taiwan, Japan
 Phoroncidia nicoleti (Roewer, 1942) — Chile
 Phoroncidia nicoleti Levi, 1964 — Chile
 Phoroncidia oahuensis (Simon, 1900) — Hawaii
 Phoroncidia paradoxa (Lucas, 1846) — Southern Europe, North Africa, Turkey
 Phoroncidia pennata (Nicolet, 1849) — Chile
 Phoroncidia personata (L. Koch, 1872) — Samoa, Fiji, Australia (Lord Howe Is.)
 Phoroncidia pilula (Karsch, 1879) — Georgia, Russia (Far East), China, Korea, Japan
 Phoroncidia pilula (Simon, 1895) — Tanzania (Zanzibar)
 Phoroncidia piratini Rodrigues & Marques, 2010 — Brazil
 Phoroncidia pukeiwa (Marples, 1955) — New Zealand
 Phoroncidia puketoru (Marples, 1955) — New Zealand
 Phoroncidia puyehue Levi, 1967 — Chile
 Phoroncidia quadrata (O. Pickard-Cambridge, 1880) — New Zealand
 Phoroncidia quadrispinella Strand, 1907 — Madagascar
 Phoroncidia ravot Levi, 1964 — Venezuela
 Phoroncidia reimoseri Levi, 1964 — Brazil
 Phoroncidia roseleviorum Kariko, 2014 — Madagascar
 Phoroncidia rotunda (Keyserling, 1890) — Australia (Queensland, Lord Howe Is.), Samoa
 Phoroncidia rubens Thorell, 1899 — Cameroon
 Phoroncidia rubroargentea Berland, 1913 — Madagascar
 Phoroncidia rubromaculata (Keyserling, 1886) — Brazil
 Phoroncidia ryukyuensis Yoshida, 1979 — Taiwan, Japan (Ryukyu Is.)
 Phoroncidia saboya Levi, 1964 — Colombia
 Phoroncidia scutellata (Taczanowski, 1879) — Peru
 Phoroncidia scutula (Nicolet, 1849) — Bolivia, Chile
 Phoroncidia septemaculeata O. Pickard-Cambridge, 1873 — India, Sri Lanka
 Phoroncidia sextuberculata (Keyserling, 1890) — Australia (Queensland)
 Phoroncidia sjostedti Tullgren, 1910 — Tanzania
 Phoroncidia spissa (Nicolet, 1849) — Chile
 Phoroncidia splendida Thorell, 1899 — West Africa
 Phoroncidia studo Levi, 1964 — Peru, Brazil
 Phoroncidia testudo (O. Pickard-Cambridge, 1873) — India, Sri Lanka
 Phoroncidia thwaitesi O. Pickard-Cambridge, 1869 — Sri Lanka
 Phoroncidia tina Levi, 1964 — Brazil
 Phoroncidia tricuspidata (Blackwall, 1863) — Brazil
 Phoroncidia trituberculata (Hickman, 1951) — Australia (Tasmania)
 Phoroncidia triunfo Levi, 1964 — Mexico to Costa Rica
 Phoroncidia truncatula (Strand, 1909) — South Africa
 Phoroncidia umbrosa (Nicolet, 1849) — Chile
 Phoroncidia variabilis (Nicolet, 1849) — Chile
 Phoroncidia vatoharanana Kariko, 2014 — Madagascar
 Phoroncidia wrightae Kariko, 2014 — Madagascar

Phycosoma

Phycosoma O. Pickard-Cambridge, 1879
 Phycosoma altum (Keyserling, 1886) — Mexico to Brazil. Introduced to Hawaii
 Phycosoma amamiense (Yoshida, 1985) — Russia (Far East), China, Korea, Japan (mainland, Ryukyu Is.)
 Phycosoma corrugum Gao & Li, 2014 — China
 Phycosoma crenatum Gao & Li, 2014 — China
 Phycosoma diaoluo Zhang & Zhang, 2012 — China
 Phycosoma digitula Zhang & Zhang, 2012 — China
 Phycosoma excisum (Simon, 1889) — Madagascar
 Phycosoma flavomarginatum (Bösenberg & Strand, 1906) — China, Korea, Japan
 Phycosoma hainanensis (Zhu, 1998) — China, Laos
 Phycosoma hana (Zhu, 1998) — China
 Phycosoma inornatum (O. Pickard-Cambridge, 1861) — Europe, Turkey, Azerbaijan
 Phycosoma jamesi (Roberts, 1979) — Jamaica, Panama
 Phycosoma japonicum (Yoshida, 1985) — Korea, Japan
 Phycosoma labialis (Zhu, 1998) — China
 Phycosoma ligulaceum Gao & Li, 2014 — China
 Phycosoma lineatipes (Bryant, 1933) — USA to Brazil
 Phycosoma martinae (Roberts, 1983) — Seychelles, India, China, Korea, Japan (Ryukyu Is.), Philippines
 Phycosoma menustya (Roberts, 1983) — Seychelles
 Phycosoma mustelinum (Simon, 1889) — Russia (Far East), China, Korea, Japan, Indonesia (Krakatau)
 Phycosoma nigromaculatum (Yoshida, 1987) — China, Taiwan, Japan, Ryukyu Is.
 Phycosoma oecobioides O. Pickard-Cambridge, 1880 (type) — New Zealand (mainland, Chatham Is.)
 Phycosoma sinica (Zhu, 1992) — China, Vietnam
 Phycosoma spundana (Roberts, 1978) — Seychelles
 Phycosoma stellaris (Zhu, 1998) — China
 Phycosoma stictum (Zhu, 1992) — China
 Phycosoma stigmosum Yin, 2012 — China

Phylloneta

Phylloneta Archer, 1950
 Phylloneta impressa (L. Koch, 1881) — North America, Europe, Turkey, Caucasus, Russia (Europe to Far East), Kazakhstan, Central Asia, China, India
 Phylloneta pictipes (Keyserling, 1884) (type) — USA
 Phylloneta sisyphia (Clerck, 1757) — Europe, Turkey, Caucasus, Russia (Europe to south Siberia), Kazakhstan, Central Asia, China
 Phylloneta sisyphia foliifera (Thorell, 1875) — Spain
 Phylloneta sisyphia torandae (Strand, 1917) — China (Yarkand), Karakorum

Platnickina

Platnickina Koçak & Kemal, 2008
 Platnickina alabamensis (Gertsch & Archer, 1942) — USA, Canada
 Platnickina antoni (Keyserling, 1884) — USA
 Platnickina fritilla Gao & Li, 2014 — China
 Platnickina kijabei (Berland, 1920) — East Africa
 Platnickina maculata (Yoshida, 2001) (type) — Japan
 Platnickina mneon (Bösenberg & Strand, 1906) — South America. Introduced to Ghana, Seychelles, China, Japan, Pacific Is.
 Platnickina nigropunctata (Lucas, 1846) — Mediterranean
 Platnickina punctosparsa (Emerton, 1882) — USA
 Platnickina qionghaiensis (Zhu, 1998) — China
 Platnickina sterninotata (Bösenberg & Strand, 1906) — Russia (Far East), China, Korea, Japan
 Platnickina tincta (Walckenaer, 1802) — North America, Europe, Turkey, Caucasus, Russia (Europe to south Siberia), Kazakhstan

Proboscidula

Proboscidula Miller, 1970
 Proboscidula loricata Miller, 1970 (type) — Angola
 Proboscidula milleri Knoflach, 1995 — Rwanda

Propostira

Propostira Simon, 1894
 Propostira quadrangulata Simon, 1894 (type) — India, Sri Lanka
 Propostira ranii Bhattacharya, 1935 — India

Pycnoepisinus

Pycnoepisinus Wunderlich, 2008
 Pycnoepisinus kilimandjaroensis Wunderlich, 2008 (type) — Kenya

R

Rhomphaea

Rhomphaea L. Koch, 1872
 Rhomphaea aculeata Thorell, 1898 — Myanmar
 Rhomphaea affinis Lessert, 1936 — Mozambique
 Rhomphaea altissima Mello-Leitão, 1941 — Brazil
 Rhomphaea angulipalpis Thorell, 1877 — Indonesia (Sulawesi)
 Rhomphaea annulipedis Yoshida & Nojima, 2010 — Japan
 Rhomphaea barycephala (Roberts, 1983) — Seychelles (Aldabra)
 Rhomphaea brasiliensis Mello-Leitão, 1920 — Venezuela, Brazil
 Rhomphaea ceraosus (Zhu & Song, 1991) — China
 Rhomphaea cometes L. Koch, 1872 (type) — New Guinea, Samoa, French Polynesia
 Rhomphaea cona (González & Carmen, 1996) — Argentina
 Rhomphaea fictilium (Hentz, 1850) — Canada to Argentina
 Rhomphaea hyrcana (Logunov & Marusik, 1990) — Georgia, Azerbaijan, China, Japan, Turkey?
 Rhomphaea irrorata Thorell, 1898 — Myanmar
 Rhomphaea labiata (Zhu & Song, 1991) — India, China, Korea, Laos, Japan
 Rhomphaea lactifera Simon, 1909 — Vietnam
 Rhomphaea longicaudata O. Pickard-Cambridge, 1872 — Greece, Lebanon
 Rhomphaea metaltissima Soares & Camargo, 1948 — Panama to Brazil
 Rhomphaea nasica (Simon, 1873) — Canary Is., Portugal, Spain, France, Italy, Croatia, Greece, Africa, St. Helena
 Rhomphaea oris (González & Carmen, 1996) — Argentina
 Rhomphaea ornatissima Dyal, 1935 — Pakistan
 Rhomphaea palmarensis (González & Carmen, 1996) — Argentina
 Rhomphaea paradoxa (Taczanowski, 1873) — St. Vincent, Mexico to Brazil
 Rhomphaea pignalitoensis (González & Carmen, 1996) — Argentina
 Rhomphaea procera (O. Pickard-Cambridge, 1898) — Costa Rica to Argentina
 Rhomphaea projiciens O. Pickard-Cambridge, 1896 — USA to Argentina. Introduced to India
 Rhomphaea recurvata (Saaristo, 1978) — Seychelles
 Rhomphaea rostrata (Simon, 1873) — Canary Is., Portugal, Spain, France, Italy, Bosnia and Herzegovina, Croatia, Greece
 Rhomphaea sagana (Dönitz & Strand, 1906) — Azerbaijan, Russia (Far East), Japan, Philippines
 Rhomphaea sinica (Zhu & Song, 1991) — China
 Rhomphaea sjostedti Tullgren, 1910 — Tanzania
 Rhomphaea tanikawai Yoshida, 2001 — China, Japan
 Rhomphaea urquharti (Bryant, 1933) — New Zealand
 Rhomphaea velhaensis (González & Carmen, 1996) — Brazil

Robertus

Robertus O. Pickard-Cambridge, 1879
 Robertus alpinus Dresco, 1959 — Italy
 Robertus arcticus (Chamberlin & Ivie, 1947) — USA (Alaska)
 Robertus arundineti (O. Pickard-Cambridge, 1871) — Europe, Turkey, Caucasus, Russia (Europe to south Siberia), Kazahstan, Central Asia, China
 Robertus banksi (Kaston, 1946) — USA, Canada
 Robertus borealis (Kaston, 1946) — USA, Canada
 Robertus brachati Wunderlich, 2011 — Turkey
 Robertus calidus Knoflach, 1995 — Congo
 Robertus cantabricus Fage, 1931 — Spain
 Robertus cardesensis Dresco, 1959 — Spain
 Robertus crosbyi (Kaston, 1946) — USA, Canada
 Robertus emeishanensis Zhu, 1998 — China
 Robertus eremophilus Chamberlin, 1928 — USA
 Robertus floridensis (Kaston, 1946) — USA
 Robertus frivaldszkyi (Chyzer, 1894) — Central and southeastern Europe
 Robertus frontatus (Banks, 1892) — USA, Canada
 Robertus fuscus (Emerton, 1894) — USA, Canada, Greenland
 Robertus golovatchi Eskov, 1987 — Georgia
 Robertus heydemanni Wiehle, 1965 — Sweden, Germany, Austria, Italy, Romania, Ukraine, Russia (Europe to west Siberia), Kazakhstan
 Robertus insignis O. Pickard-Cambridge, 1908 — Europe
 Robertus kastoni Eskov, 1987 — Russia (middle Siberia to Far East), Japan
 Robertus kuehnae Bauchhenss & Uhlenhaut, 1993 — Belgium, Switzerland, Germany, Austria
 Robertus laticeps (Keyserling, 1884) — USA
 Robertus lividus (Blackwall, 1836) — USA (Alaska), Europe, Caucasus, Russia (Europe to Far Est)
 Robertus longipalpus (Kaston, 1946) — USA, Canada
 Robertus lyrifer Holm, 1939 — Iceland, Scandinavia, Austria, Russia (Europe to Far East), Canada
 Robertus mazaurici (Simon, 1901) — France
 Robertus mediterraneus Eskov, 1987 — Mediterranean, Switzerland, Austria, Eastern Europe, Caucasus
 Robertus monticola Simon, 1914 — France
 Robertus naejangensis Seo, 2005 — Korea
 Robertus neglectus (O. Pickard-Cambridge, 1871) (type) — Europe, Russia (Europe to south Siberia), Kazakhstan
 Robertus nipponicus Yoshida, 1995 — Japan
 Robertus nojimai Yoshida, 2002 — Japan
 Robertus ogatai Yoshida, 1995 — Japan
 Robertus potanini Schenkel, 1963 — China
 Robertus pumilus (Emerton, 1909) — USA
 Robertus riparius (Keyserling, 1886) — USA, Canada
 Robertus saitoi Yoshida, 1995 — Japan
 Robertus scoticus Jackson, 1914 — Europe, Caucasus, Russia (Europe to middle Siberia)
 Robertus sibiricus Eskov, 1987 — Russia (middle Siberia to Far East), Japan
 Robertus similis (Kaston, 1946) — USA
 Robertus spinifer (Emerton, 1909) — USA
 Robertus subtilis Seo, 2015 — Korea
 Robertus truncorum (L. Koch, 1872) — France to Ukraine
 Robertus ungulatus Vogelsanger, 1944 — Europe, Russia (south Siberia to Far East), China
 Robertus ussuricus Eskov, 1987 — Russia (Far East)
 Robertus vigerens (Chamberlin & Ivie, 1933) — USA, Canada

Ruborridion

Ruborridion Wunderlich, 2011
 Ruborridion musivum (Simon, 1873) (type) — Mediterranean, India

Rugathodes

Rugathodes Archer, 1950
 Rugathodes acoreensis Wunderlich, 1992 — Azores
 Rugathodes aurantius (Emerton, 1915) — North America, Russia (Europe to Far East), Kazakhstan
 Rugathodes bellicosus (Simon, 1873) — Europe, Russia (Europe to south Siberia)
 Rugathodes instabilis (O. Pickard-Cambridge, 1871) — Europe, Russia (Europe to west Siberia)
 Rugathodes madeirensis Wunderlich, 1987 — Madeira
 Rugathodes nigrolimbatus (Yaginuma, 1972) — Japan
 Rugathodes pico (Merrett & Ashmole, 1989) — Azores
 Rugathodes sexpunctatus (Emerton, 1882) (type) — USA, Canada, Russia (Commander Is.). Introduced to Britain

S

Sardinidion

Sardinidion Wunderlich, 1995
 Sardinidion blackwalli (O. Pickard-Cambridge, 1871) (type) — Europe, North Africa

Selkirkiella

Selkirkiella Berland, 1924
 Selkirkiella alboguttata Berland, 1924 (type) — Chile (Juan Fernandez Is.)
 Selkirkiella carelmapuensis (Levi, 1963) — Chile
 Selkirkiella luisi (Levi, 1967) — Chile
 Selkirkiella magallanes (Levi, 1963) — Chile
 Selkirkiella michaelseni (Simon, 1902) — Chile
 Selkirkiella purpurea (Nicolet, 1849) — Chile
 Selkirkiella ventrosa (Nicolet, 1849) — Chile, Argentina, Falkland Is.
 Selkirkiella wellingtoni (Levi, 1967) — Chile

Sesato

Sesato Saaristo, 2006
 Sesato setosa Saaristo, 2006 (type) — Seychelles

Seycellesa

Seycellesa Koçak & Kemal, 2008
 Seycellesa braueri (Simon, 1898) (type) — Seychelles

Simitidion

Simitidion Wunderlich, 1992
 Simitidion agaricographum (Levy & Amitai, 1982) — Tunisia,  Greece (mainland, Crete), Turkey, Cyprus, Israel
 Simitidion lacuna Wunderlich, 1992 — Canary Is., Spain, North Africa, Israel
 Simitidion simile (C. L. Koch, 1836) (type) — Canada, Europe, North Africa, Turkey, Israel, Caucasus, Central Asia

Spheropistha

Spheropistha Yaginuma, 1957
 Spheropistha huangsangensis (Yin, Peng & Bao, 2004) — China
 Spheropistha melanosoma Yaginuma, 1957 (type) — Japan, Korea?
 Spheropistha miyashitai (Tanikawa, 1998) — Japan
 Spheropistha nigroris (Yoshida, Tso & Severinghaus, 2000) — Taiwan
 Spheropistha orbita (Zhu, 1998) — China
 Spheropistha rhomboides (Yin, Peng & Bao, 2004) — China
 Spheropistha xinhua Barrion, Barrion-Dupo & Heong, 2013 — China

Spinembolia

Spinembolia Saaristo, 2006
 Spinembolia clabnum (Roberts, 1978) (type) — Seychelles

Spintharus

Spintharus Hentz, 1850
 Spintharus argenteus Dyal, 1935 — Pakistan
 Spintharus barackobamai Agnarsson & Van Patten, 2018 — Cuba
 Spintharus berniesandersi Agnarsson & Sargeant, 2018 — Cuba
 Spintharus davidattenboroughi Agnarsson & Van Patten, 2018 — Jamaica
 Spintharus davidbowiei Agnarsson & Chomitz, 2018 — Mexico
 Spintharus dayleae Sargeant & Agnarsson, 2018 — Saint Lucia, Grenada
 Spintharus flavidus Hentz, 1850 (type) — USA; Central and South America: misidentified
 Spintharus frosti Van Patten & Agnarsson, 2018 — Dominican Rep.
 Spintharus giraldoalayoni Agnarsson & Chomitz, 2018 — Cuba
 Spintharus goodbreadae Chomitz & Agnarsson, 2018 — Cuba
 Spintharus gracilis Keyserling, 1886 — Brazil
 Spintharus greerae Sargeant & Agnarsson, 2018 — Mexico
 Spintharus jesselaueri Sargeant & Agnarsson, 2018 — Dominica
 Spintharus leonardodicaprioi Van Patten & Agnarsson, 2018 — Dominican Rep.
 Spintharus manrayi Chomitz & Agnarsson, 2018 — Cuba
 Spintharus michelleobamaae Agnarsson & Sargeant, 2018 — Cuba
 Spintharus rallorum Chomitz & Agnarsson, 2018 — Jamaica, Saint Kitts and Nevis
 Spintharus skelly Van Patten & Agnarsson, 2018 — Dominican Rep.

Steatoda

Steatoda Sundevall, 1833
 Steatoda adumbrata (Simon, 1908) — Australia (Western Australia)
 Steatoda aethiopica (Simon, 1909) — Central Africa
 Steatoda alamosa Gertsch, 1960 — USA, Mexico
 Steatoda alboclathrata (Simon, 1897) — India
 Steatoda albomaculata (De Geer, 1778) — North America, Europe, North Africa to Israel, Russia (Europe to Far East), Central Asia, China, Korea, Japan
 Steatoda albomaculata infuscata (Schenkel, 1925) — Switzerland
 Steatoda ancora (Grube, 1861) — Russia (south Siberia)
 Steatoda ancorata (Holmberg, 1876) — Mexico to Chile
 Steatoda andina (Keyserling, 1884) — Venezuela to Chile
 Steatoda apacheana Gertsch, 1960 — USA
 Steatoda atascadera Chamberlin & Ivie, 1942 — USA
 Steatoda atrocyanea (Simon, 1880) — New Caledonia, Loyalty Is.
 Steatoda autumnalis (Banks, 1898) — Mexico
 Steatoda badia (Roewer, 1961) — Senegal
 Steatoda bertkaui (Thorell, 1881) — Indonesia (Moluccas), New Guinea
 Steatoda bipunctata (Linnaeus, 1758) — Europe, Turkey, Caucasus, Russia (Europe to Far East), Iran, Central Asia, China. Introduced to South America
 Steatoda borealis (Hentz, 1850) — USA, Canada
 Steatoda bradyi (Strand, 1907) — South Africa
 Steatoda capensis Hann, 1990 — South Africa, Lesotho. Introduced to St. Helena, Australia, New Zealand
 Steatoda carbonaria (Simon, 1907) — Congo, Equatorial Guinea (Bioko)
 Steatoda carbonaria minor (Simon, 1907) — Congo
 Steatoda caspia Ponomarev, 2007 — Kazakhstan
 Steatoda castanea (Clerck, 1757) (type) — Europe, Turkey, Russia (Europe to Far East), Caucasus, Iran, Central Asia, China. Introduced to Canada
 Steatoda chinchipe Levi, 1962 — Ecuador, Peru
 Steatoda cingulata (Thorell, 1890) — China, India, Korea, Vietnam, Laos, Japan, Indonesia (Sumatra, Java)
 Steatoda connexa (O. Pickard-Cambridge, 1904) — South Africa
 Steatoda craniformis Zhu & Song, 1992 — China
 Steatoda dahli (Nosek, 1905) — Turkey, Israel, Caucasus, Russia (Europe) to Central Asia
 Steatoda diamantina Levi, 1962 — Brazil
 Steatoda distincta (Blackwall, 1859) — Madeira
 Steatoda ephippiata (Thorell, 1875) — Algeria to Israel, Iran
 Steatoda erigoniformis (O. Pickard-Cambridge, 1872) — East Mediterranean to Middle East, Caucasus, China, Korea, Japan. Introduced to the Caribbean.
 Steatoda fagei (Lawrence, 1964) — South Africa
 Steatoda fallax (Blackwall, 1865) — Cape Verde Is.
 Steatoda felina (Simon, 1907) — Congo
 Steatoda foravae Dippenaar-Schoeman & Müller, 1992 — South Africa
 Steatoda grandis Banks, 1901 — USA
 Steatoda grossa (C. L. Koch, 1838) — Europe, Turkey, Caucasus, Russia (Europe to Far East), Central Asia, China, Korea, Japan. Introduced to North America, Ecuador, Peru, Chile, Hawaii Is., Macaronesia, Algeria
 Steatoda grossa strandi (Ermolajev, 1934) — Russia (west Siberia)
 Steatoda gui Zhu, 1998 — China
 Steatoda hespera Chamberlin & Ivie, 1933 — USA, Canada
 Steatoda hui Zhu, 1998 — China
 Steatoda iheringi (Keyserling, 1886) — Brazil, Paraguay, Argentina
 Steatoda incomposita (Denis, 1957) — Portugal, Spain, France (incl. Corsica)
 Steatoda kiwuensis (Strand, 1913) — Central Africa
 Steatoda kuytunensis Zhu, 1998 — China
 Steatoda latifasciata (Simon, 1873) — Canary Is. to Israel
 Steatoda lawrencei Brignoli, 1983 — South Africa
 Steatoda lenzi (Strand, 1907) — South Africa
 Steatoda leonardi (Thorell, 1898) — Myanmar
 Steatoda lepida (O. Pickard-Cambridge, 1880) — New Zealand
 Steatoda linzhiensis Hu, 2001 — China
 Steatoda livens (Simon, 1894) — Australia (Tasmania)
 Steatoda longurio (Simon, 1909) — Central Africa
 Steatoda mainlingensis (Hu & Li, 1987) — Kyrgyzstan, China
 Steatoda mainlingoides Yin, Griswold, Bao & Xu, 2003 — China
 Steatoda marmorata (Simon, 1910) — South Africa
 Steatoda marta Levi, 1962 — Colombia
 Steatoda maura (Simon, 1909) — Mediterranean
 Steatoda mexicana Levi, 1957 — USA, Mexico
 Steatoda micans (Hogg, 1922) — Vietnam
 Steatoda minima (Denis, 1955) — Niger
 Steatoda moerens (Thorell, 1875) — Algeria, Tunisia
 Steatoda moesta (O. Pickard-Cambridge, 1896) — Mexico to Brazil
 Steatoda morsitans (O. Pickard-Cambridge, 1885) — South Africa
 Steatoda nahuana Gertsch, 1960 — Mexico
 Steatoda nasata (Chrysanthus, 1975) — Indonesia (Krakatau), Papua New Guinea (New Ireland), Australia
 Steatoda ngipina Barrion & Litsinger, 1995 — Philippines
 Steatoda nigrimaculata Zhang, Chen & Zhu, 2001 — China
 Steatoda nigrocincta O. Pickard-Cambridge, 1885 — China (Yarkand)
 Steatoda niveosignata (Simon, 1908) — Australia (Western Australia)
 Steatoda nobilis (Thorell, 1875) — Macaronesia. Introduced to USA, Chile, Ecuador, Colombia, Europe, Turkey, Iran
 Steatoda octonotata (Simon, 1908) — Australia (Western Australia)
 Steatoda palomara Chamberlin & Ivie, 1935 — USA
 Steatoda panja Barrion, Barrion-Dupo & Heong, 2013 — China
 Steatoda pardalia Yin, Griswold, Bao & Xu, 2003 — China
 Steatoda paykulliana (Walckenaer, 1806) — Europe, Mediterranean to Central Asia
 Steatoda paykulliana obsoleta (Strand, 1908) — Ethiopia
 Steatoda pengyangensis Hu & Zhang, 2012 — China
 Steatoda perakensis Simon, 1901 — Malaysia
 Steatoda perspicillata (Thorell, 1898) — Myanmar
 Steatoda picea (Thorell, 1899) — Cameroon
 Steatoda porteri (Simon, 1900) — Chile
 Steatoda punctulata (Marx, 1898) — USA, Mexico
 Steatoda quadrimaculata (O. Pickard-Cambridge, 1896) — USA to Venezuela, Caribbean
 Steatoda quaesita (O. Pickard-Cambridge, 1896) — Mexico
 Steatoda quinquenotata (Blackwall, 1865) — Cape Verde Is.
 Steatoda retorta González, 1987 — Argentina
 Steatoda rhombifera (Grube, 1861) — Russia (middle Siberia)
 Steatoda rubrocalceolata (Simon, 1907) — Equatorial Guinea (Bioko)
 Steatoda rufoannulata (Simon, 1899) — India, Sri Lanka, Sumatra, Java
 Steatoda sabulosa (Tullgren, 1901) — Bolivia, Argentina, Chile
 Steatoda sagax (Blackwall, 1865) — Cape Verde Is.
 Steatoda saltensis Levi, 1957 — Mexico
 Steatoda seriata (Simon, 1899) — Indonesia (Sumatra)
 Steatoda singoides (Tullgren, 1910) — Tanzania
 Steatoda sordidata O. Pickard-Cambridge, 1885 — China (Yarkand)
 Steatoda speciosa (Thorell, 1898) — Myanmar
 Steatoda spina Gao & Li, 2014 — China
 Steatoda subannulata (Kulczyński, 1911) — New Guinea, Papua New Guinea (New Britain)
 Steatoda terastiosa Zhu, 1998 — China
 Steatoda terebrui Gao & Li, 2014 — China
 Steatoda tigrina (Tullgren, 1910) — Tanzania
 Steatoda tortoisea Yin, Griswold, Bao & Xu, 2003 — China
 Steatoda transversa (Banks, 1898) — USA, Mexico
 Steatoda trianguloides Levy, 1991 — France (Corsica), Israel
 Steatoda triangulosa (Walckenaer, 1802) — Europe, Turkey, Caucasus, Russia (Europe to Far East), Central Asia. Introduced to Canada, USA, Canary Is.
 Steatoda triangulosa concolor (Caporiacco, 1933) — Libya
 Steatoda tristis (Tullgren, 1910) — Tanzania
 Steatoda tristis ruwenzorica (Strand, 1913) — Uganda
 Steatoda truncata (Urquhart, 1888) — New Zealand
 Steatoda ulleungensis Paik, 1995 — Korea
 Steatoda uncata Zhang, Chen & Zhu, 2001 — China
 Steatoda variabilis (Berland, 1920) — East Africa
 Steatoda variata Gertsch, 1960 — USA, Mexico
 Steatoda variata china Gertsch, 1960 — USA, Mexico
 Steatoda variipes (Keyserling, 1884) — Peru
 Steatoda vaulogeri (Simon, 1909) — Vietnam
 Steatoda venator (Audouin, 1826) — Libya, Egypt
 Steatoda violacea (Strand, 1906) — Ethiopia
 Steatoda wangi Zhu, 1998 — China
 Steatoda wanshou Yin, 2012 — China
 Steatoda washona Gertsch, 1960 — USA, Mexico
 Steatoda xerophila Levy & Amitai, 1982 — Israel
 Steatoda xishuiensis Zhang, Chen & Zhu, 2001 — China

Stemmops

Stemmops O. Pickard-Cambridge, 1894
 Stemmops belavista Marques & Buckup, 1996 — Brazil
 Stemmops bicolor O. Pickard-Cambridge, 1894 (type) — USA to Panama, Cuba, Bahama Is.
 Stemmops cambridgei Levi, 1955 — Mexico, Honduras
 Stemmops carajas Santanna & Rodrigues, 2018 — Brazil
 Stemmops caranavi Marques & Buckup, 1996 — Bolivia
 Stemmops carauari Santanna & Rodrigues, 2018 — Brazil
 Stemmops carius Marques & Buckup, 1996 — Brazil
 Stemmops concolor Simon, 1898 — St. Vincent
 Stemmops cryptus Levi, 1955 — Panama
 Stemmops forcipus Zhu, 1998 — China, Laos
 Stemmops guapiacu Santanna & Rodrigues, 2018 — Brazil
 Stemmops lina Levi, 1955 — Mexico
 Stemmops mellus Levi, 1964 — Panama
 Stemmops murici Santanna & Rodrigues, 2018 — Brazil
 Stemmops nigrabdomenus Zhu, 1998 — China, Laos
 Stemmops nipponicus Yaginuma, 1969 — Russia (Far East), China, Korea, Japan
 Stemmops ornatus (Bryant, 1933) — USA
 Stemmops orsus Levi, 1964 — Panama, Brazil
 Stemmops osorno (Levi, 1963) — Chile
 Stemmops pains Santanna & Rodrigues, 2018 — Brazil
 Stemmops questus Levi, 1955 — Mexico to Venezuela
 Stemmops salenas Marques & Buckup, 1996 — Brazil
 Stemmops satpudaensis Rajoria, 2015 — India
 Stemmops servus Levi, 1964 — Panama, Brazil
 Stemmops subtilis (Simon, 1895) — Venezuela
 Stemmops vicosa Levi, 1964 — Brazil
 Stemmops victoria Levi, 1955 — Mexico

Stoda

Stoda Saaristo, 2006
 Stoda libudum (Roberts, 1978) (type) — Seychelles

Styposis

Styposis Simon, 1894
 Styposis ajo Levi, 1960 — USA
 Styposis albula (Gertsch, 1960) — Guyana
 Styposis camoteensis (Levi, 1967) — Chile (Juan Fernandez Is.)
 Styposis chickeringi Levi, 1960 — Panama
 Styposis clausis Levi, 1960 — USA to Colombia
 Styposis colorados Levi, 1964 — Ecuador
 Styposis flavescens Simon, 1894 (type) — Nicaragua to Venezuela
 Styposis kahuziensis Miller, 1970 — Congo
 Styposis lutea (Petrunkevitch, 1930) — Puerto Rico
 Styposis nicaraguensis Levi, 1960 — Nicaragua
 Styposis rancho Levi, 1960 — Venezuela
 Styposis scleropsis Levi, 1960 — Panama
 Styposis selis Levi, 1964 — Brazil
 Styposis tepus (Levi, 1967) — Chile

T

Takayus

Takayus Yoshida, 2001
 Takayus chikunii (Yaginuma, 1960) — China, Japan
 Takayus codomaculatus Yin, 2012 — China
 Takayus fujisawai Yoshida, 2002 — Japan
 Takayus huanrenensis (Zhu & Gao, 1993) — China
 Takayus kunmingicus (Zhu, 1998) — China
 Takayus latifolius (Yaginuma, 1960) — Russia (Far East), China, Korea, Japan
 Takayus linimaculatus (Zhu, 1998) — China
 Takayus lunulatus (Guan & Zhu, 1993) — Russia (Far East), China, Korea
 Takayus lushanensis (Zhu, 1998) — China
 Takayus naevius (Zhu, 1998) — China
 Takayus papiliomaculatus Yin, Peng & Zhang, 2005 — China
 Takayus quadrimaculatus (Song & Kim, 1991) — China, Korea
 Takayus simplicus Yin, 2012 — China
 Takayus sublatifolius (Zhu, 1998) — China
 Takayus takayensis (Saito, 1939) (type) — China, Korea, Japan
 Takayus wangi (Zhu, 1998) — China
 Takayus xui (Zhu, 1998) — China

Tamanidion

Tamanidion Wunderlich, 2011
 Tamanidion multidenticuli Wunderlich, 2011 (type) — Malaysia

Tekellina

Tekellina Levi, 1957
 Tekellina archboldi Levi, 1957 (type) — USA
 Tekellina bella Marques & Buckup, 1993 — Brazil
 Tekellina crica Marques & Buckup, 1993 — Brazil
 Tekellina guaiba Marques & Buckup, 1993 — Brazil
 Tekellina helixicis Gao & Li, 2014 — China
 Tekellina minor Marques & Buckup, 1993 — Brazil
 Tekellina pretiosa Marques & Buckup, 1993 — Brazil
 Tekellina sadamotoi Yoshida & Ogata, 2016 — Japan
 Tekellina yoshidai Marusik & Omelko, 2017 — Russia (Far East)

Theonoe

Theonoe Simon, 1881
 Theonoe africana Caporiacco, 1947 — Tanzania
 Theonoe formivora (Walckenaer, 1841) — France
 Theonoe major Denis, 1961 — Spain
 Theonoe minutissima (O. Pickard-Cambridge, 1879) (type) — Europe
 Theonoe sola Thaler & Steinberger, 1988 — Germany, Austria
 Theonoe stridula Crosby, 1906 — USA, Canada

Theridion

Theridion Walckenaer, 1805
 Theridion abruptum Simon, 1884 — North Africa
 Theridion acanthopodum Gao & Li, 2014 — China
 Theridion accoense Levy, 1985 — Israel
 Theridion acutitarse Simon, 1900 — Hawaii
 Theridion adjacens (O. Pickard-Cambridge, 1896) — Mexico to Panama
 Theridion adrianopoli Drensky, 1915 — Macedonia, Bulgaria, Albania, Greece (incl. Crete), Turkey
 Theridion aeolium Levi, 1963 — USA
 Theridion agrarium Levi, 1963 — Brazil
 Theridion agreste Nicolet, 1849 — Chile
 Theridion agrifoliae Levi, 1957 — USA, Canada
 Theridion akme Levi, 1959 — Panama
 Theridion akron Levi, 1959 — Panama
 Theridion albidorsum Strand, 1909 — South Africa
 Theridion albidum Banks, 1895 — USA, Canada
 Theridion albioculum Zhu, 1998 — China
 Theridion albipes L. Koch, 1878 — Caucasus (Russia, Georgia)
 Theridion albocinctum Urquhart, 1892 — New Zealand
 Theridion albodecoratum Rainbow, 1916 — Australia (Queensland)
 Theridion albolineatum Nicolet, 1849 — Chile
 Theridion albolineolatum Caporiacco, 1940 — Ethiopia
 Theridion albomaculosum O. Pickard-Cambridge, 1869 — Sri Lanka
 Theridion albopictum Thorell, 1898 — Myanmar
 Theridion albostriatum (L. Koch, 1867) — New Guinea, Australia (Queensland, Norfolk Is.), Tonga
 Theridion albulum O. Pickard-Cambridge, 1898 — Panama
 Theridion amarga Levi, 1967 — Chile, Argentina
 Theridion amatitlan Levi, 1963 — Guatemala
 Theridion ambiguum Nicolet, 1849 — Chile
 Theridion ampascachi Mello-Leitão, 1941 — Argentina
 Theridion ampliatum Urquhart, 1892 — New Zealand
 Theridion angusticeps Caporiacco, 1949 — Kenya
 Theridion angustifrons Caporiacco, 1934 — Karakorum
 Theridion anson Levi, 1967 — Chile (Juan Fernandez Is.)
 Theridion antillanum Simon, 1894 — Caribbean
 Theridion apiculatum Roewer, 1942 — Australia (Queensland)
 Theridion aporum Levi, 1963 — Brazil
 Theridion apostoli Mello-Leitão, 1945 — Argentina
 Theridion apulco Levi, 1959 — Mexico
 Theridion aragua Levi, 1963 — Venezuela
 Theridion archeri Levi, 1959 — Cuba
 Theridion argentatulum Roewer, 1942 — New Zealand
 Theridion arizonense Levi, 1957 — USA
 Theridion artum Levi, 1959 — Panama, Trinidad
 Theridion aruanum Strand, 1911 — Indonesia (Aru Is.)
 Theridion arushae Caporiacco, 1947 — Tanzania
 Theridion asbolodes Rainbow, 1917 — Australia (South Australia)
 Theridion asopi Vanuytven, 2014 — Western and Central Europe, Italy
 Theridion astrigerum Thorell, 1895 — Myanmar
 Theridion atratum Thorell, 1877 — Indonesia (Sulawesi)
 Theridion attritum (Simon, 1908) — Australia (Western Australia)
 Theridion auberti Simon, 1904 — South Africa
 Theridion aulos Levi, 1963 — Brazil
 Theridion australe Banks, 1899 — USA, Mexico, Caribbean
 Theridion baccula Thorell, 1887 — Myanmar
 Theridion baltasarense Levi, 1963 — Windward Is.
 Theridion banksi Berland, 1920 — East Africa
 Theridion barbarae Levi, 1959 — Mexico
 Theridion beebei Levi, 1963 — Venezuela
 Theridion bellatulum Levi, 1963 — Brazil
 Theridion bengalensis Sen, Saha & Raychaudhuri, 2011 — India
 Theridion bergi Levi, 1963 — Brazil, Paraguay, Argentina
 Theridion berlandi Roewer, 1942 — Samoa
 Theridion bernardi Lecigne, 2017 — Portugal
 Theridion betteni Wiehle, 1960 — Europe, Turkey
 Theridion bicruciatum Roewer, 1961 — Senegal
 Theridion bidepressum Yin, Peng & Zhang, 2005 — China
 Theridion biezankoi Levi, 1963 — Brazil
 Theridion biforaminum Gao & Zhu, 1993 — China
 Theridion biolleyi Banks, 1909 — Costa Rica
 Theridion biseriatum Thorell, 1890 — Indonesia (Sumatra)
 Theridion bisignatum (Mello-Leitão, 1945) — Brazil, Argentina
 Theridion bitakum Barrion & Litsinger, 1995 — Philippines
 Theridion blaisei Simon, 1909 — Vietnam
 Theridion boesenbergi Strand, 1904 — Europe, Caucasus
 Theridion bolivari Levi, 1959 — Mexico
 Theridion bolum Levi, 1963 — Brazil
 Theridion bomae Schmidt, 1957 — Congo
 Theridion bosniense Wunderlich, 2011 — Bosnia and Herzegovina
 Theridion botanicum Levi, 1963 — Venezuela
 Theridion brachypus Thorell, 1887 — Myanmar
 Theridion bradyanum Strand, 1907 — South Africa
 Theridion brunellii Caporiacco, 1940 — Ethiopia
 Theridion brunneonigrum Caporiacco, 1949 — Kenya
 Theridion bryantae Roewer, 1951 — Mexico
 Theridion bullatum Tullgren, 1910 — Tanzania
 Theridion buxtoni Berland, 1929 — Samoa, French Polynesia (Society Is., Tuamotu Arch.), Pitcairn Is. (Henderson Is.)
 Theridion cairoense Wunderlich, 2011 — Egypt
 Theridion calcynatum Holmberg, 1876 — Venezuela to Argentina
 Theridion californicum Banks, 1904 — USA, Canada
 Theridion caliginosum Marples, 1955 — Samoa
 Theridion cameronense Levi, 1957 — USA, Mexico
 Theridion campestratum Simon, 1900 — Hawaii
 Theridion caplandense Strand, 1907 — South Africa
 Theridion carinatum Yin, Peng & Zhang, 2005 — China
 Theridion carpathium Brignoli, 1984 — Greece
 Theridion cassinicola Simon, 1907 — Guinea-Bissau
 Theridion castaneum Franganillo, 1931 — Cuba
 Theridion catharina Marples, 1955 — Samoa
 Theridion cavipalpe (F. O. Pickard-Cambridge, 1902) — Guatemala
 Theridion cazieri Levi, 1959 — Bahama Is.
 Theridion centrum Levi, 1959 — Panama
 Theridion ceylonicus Dunlop & Jekel, 2009 — Sri Lanka
 Theridion chacoense Levi, 1963 — Bolivia
 Theridion chakinuense Wunderlich, 1995 — Turkmenistan
 Theridion chamberlini Caporiacco, 1949 — Kenya
 Theridion charitonowi Caporiacco, 1949 — Kenya
 Theridion charlati Dierkens, 2016 — French Polynesia (Society Is.: Tahiti)
 Theridion cheimatos Gertsch & Archer, 1942 — USA
 Theridion cheni Zhu, 1998 — China
 Theridion chihuahua Levi, 1959 — Mexico
 Theridion chiriqui Levi, 1959 — Panama
 Theridion chonetum Zhu, 1998 — China
 Theridion choroni Levi, 1963 — Venezuela
 Theridion cinctipes Banks, 1898 — USA, Mexico
 Theridion cinereum Thorell, 1875 — Switzerland and Italy to Ukraine and Turkey, Caucasus, Russia (Europe) to Central Asia
 Theridion circuitum Gao & Li, 2014 — China
 Theridion circumtextum Simon, 1907 — Guinea-Bissau
 Theridion climacode Thorell, 1898 — Myanmar
 Theridion clivalum Zhu, 1998 — China
 Theridion cloxum Roberts, 1983 — Seychelles (Aldabra)
 Theridion clypeatellum Tullgren, 1910 — East Africa
 Theridion cochise Levi, 1963 — USA
 Theridion cochrum Levi, 1963 — Brazil
 Theridion cocosense Strand, 1906 — Costa Rica
 Theridion coenosum Thorell, 1887 — Myanmar
 Theridion cohni Levi, 1963 — Brazil
 Theridion coldeniae Baert & Maelfait, 1986 — Ecuador (Galapagos Is.)
 Theridion comstocki Berland, 1920 — East Africa
 Theridion confusum O. Pickard-Cambridge, 1885 — China (Yarkand)
 Theridion contreras Levi, 1959 — Mexico
 Theridion convexellum Roewer, 1942 — Australia (Queensland, New South Wales)
 Theridion convexisternum Caporiacco, 1949 — Kenya
 Theridion corcyraeum Brignoli, 1984 — Greece (Corfu, Crete)
 Theridion costaricaense Levi, 1963 — Costa Rica to Venezuela
 Theridion cowlesae Levi, 1957 — USA
 Theridion coyoacan Levi, 1959 — Mexico
 Theridion cruciferum Urquhart, 1886 — New Zealand
 Theridion crucum Levi, 1959 — Mexico
 Theridion cuspulatum Schmidt & Krause, 1998 — Cape Verde Is.
 Theridion cuyutlan Levi, 1963 — Mexico
 Theridion cygneum Gao & Li, 2014 — China
 Theridion cynicum Gertsch & Mulaik, 1936 — USA, Mexico
 Theridion cyprusense Wunderlich, 2011 — Cyprus
 Theridion dafnense Levy & Amitai, 1982 — Israel
 Theridion darolense Strand, 1906 — Ethiopia
 Theridion davisorum Levi, 1959 — Mexico
 Theridion dayongense Zhu, 1998 — China
 Theridion decemmaculatum Thorell, 1890 — Indonesia (Sumatra)
 Theridion decemperlatum (Simon, 1889) — Madagascar
 Theridion dedux O. Pickard-Cambridge, 1904 — South Africa
 Theridion delicatum O. Pickard-Cambridge, 1904 — South Africa
 Theridion derhami Simon, 1895 — Sierra Leone, Gabon, Equatorial Guinea (Bioko)
 Theridion desertum Ponomarev, 2008 — Kazakhstan
 Theridion diadematum Chrysanthus, 1963 — New Guinea
 Theridion dianiphum Rainbow, 1916 — Australia (Queensland)
 Theridion differens Emerton, 1882 — USA, Canada
 Theridion dilucidum Simon, 1898 — Costa Rica to Venezuela, Caribbean
 Theridion dilutum Levi, 1957 — USA, Mexico
 Theridion dividuum Gertsch & Archer, 1942 — USA
 Theridion dominica Levi, 1963 — Dominican Rep.
 Theridion dreisbachi Levi, 1959 — Mexico
 Theridion dubium Bradley, 1877 — New Guinea
 Theridion dukouense Zhu, 1998 — China
 Theridion dulcineum Gertsch & Archer, 1942 — USA
 Theridion durbanicum Lawrence, 1947 — South Africa
 Theridion ecuadorense Levi, 1963 — Ecuador
 Theridion electum (O. Pickard-Cambridge, 1896) — Mexico
 Theridion elegantissimum Roewer, 1942 — Taiwan
 Theridion elevatum Thorell, 1881 — Australia (Queensland)
 Theridion elisabethae Roewer, 1951 — Mexico
 Theridion elli Sedgwick, 1973 — Chile
 Theridion ellicottense Dobyns & Bond, 1996 — USA
 Theridion emertoni Berland, 1920 — East Africa
 Theridion epiense Berland, 1938 — Vanuatu
 Theridion eremum Levi, 1963 — Brazil
 Theridion eugeni Roewer, 1942 — Equatorial Guinea (Bioko)
 Theridion evexum Keyserling, 1884 — Mexico, Caribbean to Brazil
 Theridion excavatum F. O. Pickard-Cambridge, 1902 — Guatemala
 Theridion exlineae Levi, 1963 — Ecuador, Peru
 Theridion expallidatum O. Pickard-Cambridge, 1885 — China (Yarkand)
 Theridion falcatum Gao & Li, 2014 — China
 Theridion familiare O. Pickard-Cambridge, 1871 — Europe, Caucasus, China
 Theridion fastosum Keyserling, 1884 — Ecuador, Peru
 Theridion fatuhivaense Berland, 1933 — Marquesas Is.
 Theridion femorale Thorell, 1881 — Australia (Queensland)
 Theridion femoratissimum Caporiacco, 1949 — Kenya
 Theridion fernandense Simon, 1907 — Equatorial Guinea (Bioko)
 Theridion filum Levi, 1963 — Brazil
 Theridion flabelliferum Urquhart, 1887 — New Zealand
 Theridion flavonotatum Becker, 1879 — USA, Cuba
 Theridion flavoornatum Thorell, 1898 — Myanmar
 Theridion fornicatum Simon, 1884 — Sudan
 Theridion frio Levi, 1959 — Mexico
 Theridion frizzellorum Levi, 1963 — Colombia, Ecuador, Venezuela
 Theridion frondeum Hentz, 1850 — USA, Bahama Is.
 Theridion fruticum Simon, 1890 — Yemen
 Theridion furfuraceum Simon, 1914 — France, Algeria, Syria
 Theridion fuscodecoratum Rainbow, 1916 — Australia (Queensland)
 Theridion fuscomaculatum Rainbow, 1916 — Australia (Queensland)
 Theridion fuscum Franganillo, 1930 — Cuba
 Theridion gabardi Simon, 1895 — Sri Lanka
 Theridion galerum Levi, 1959 — Panama
 Theridion gekkonicum Levy & Amitai, 1982 — Israel
 Theridion geminipunctum Chamberlin, 1924 — USA, Mexico
 Theridion genistae Simon, 1873 — Mediterranean
 Theridion gertschi Levi, 1959 — USA, Mexico
 Theridion gibbum Rainbow, 1916 — Australia (Queensland)
 Theridion giraulti Rainbow, 1916 — Australia (Queensland)
 Theridion glaciale Caporiacco, 1934 — Karakorum
 Theridion glaucescens Becker, 1879 — USA, Canada
 Theridion glaucinum Simon, 1881 — France
 Theridion goodnightorum Levi, 1957 — USA, Mexico
 Theridion gracilipes Urquhart, 1889 — New Zealand
 Theridion grallator Simon, 1900 — Hawaii
 Theridion gramineum Zhu, 1998 — China
 Theridion grammatophorum Simon, 1909 — Vietnam
 Theridion grandiosum Levi, 1963 — Peru
 Theridion grecia Levi, 1959 — Mexico to Venezuela
 Theridion gyirongense Hu & Li, 1987 — China
 Theridion hainenense Zhu, 1998 — China
 Theridion haleakalense Simon, 1900 — Hawaii
 Theridion hannoniae Denis, 1945 — Europe, North Africa, Turkey, Madeira, Canary Is.
 Theridion harmsi Wunderlich, 2011 — Portugal, Spain, France
 Theridion hartmeyeri Simon, 1908 — Australia (Western Australia)
 Theridion hassleri Levi, 1963 — Hispaniola
 Theridion hebridisianum Berland, 1938 — Vanuatu
 Theridion helena Wunderlich, 2011 — Greece (Crete)
 Theridion helophorum Thorell, 1895 — Indonesia (Java)
 Theridion hemerobium Simon, 1914 — USA, Canada, Europe, Turkey
 Theridion hermonense Levy, 1991 — Tunisia, Israel, Iran
 Theridion hewitti Caporiacco, 1949 — Ethiopia
 Theridion hidalgo Levi, 1957 — USA, Mexico
 Theridion hierichonticum Levy & Amitai, 1982 — Israel
 Theridion hispidum O. Pickard-Cambridge, 1898 — Mexico, Caribbean to Paraguay
 Theridion histrionicum Thorell, 1875 — Italy
 Theridion hondurense Levi, 1959 — Honduras
 Theridion hopkinsi Berland, 1929 — Samoa
 Theridion hotanense Zhu & Zhou, 1993 — China
 Theridion huanuco Levi, 1963 — Peru
 Theridion hufengense Tang, Yin & Peng, 2005 — China
 Theridion hui Zhu, 1998 — China
 Theridion humboldti Levi, 1967 — Peru
 Theridion hummeli Schenkel, 1936 — China
 Theridion hupingense Yin, 2012 — China
 Theridion idiotypum Rainbow, 1917 — Australia (South Australia)
 Theridion illecebrosum Simon, 1886 — Senegal
 Theridion impegrum Keyserling, 1886 — Brazil
 Theridion impressithorax Simon, 1895 — Philippines
 Theridion incanescens Simon, 1890 — Egypt, Yemen
 Theridion incertissimum (Caporiacco, 1954) — French Guiana, Brazil
 Theridion incertum O. Pickard-Cambridge, 1885 — India
 Theridion incomtum (O. Pickard-Cambridge, 1896) — Guatemala
 Theridion inconspicuum Thorell, 1898 — Myanmar
 Theridion indicum Tikader, 1977 — India (Andaman Is.)
 Theridion innocuum Thorell, 1875 — Ukraine, Russia (Europe to south Siberia), Kazakhstan
 Theridion inquinatum Thorell, 1878 — Myanmar, Singapore, Indonesia (Ambon)
 Theridion inquinatum continentale Strand, 1907 — China
 Theridion insignitarse Simon, 1907 — Gabon
 Theridion intritum (Bishop & Crosby, 1926) — USA
 Theridion iramon Levi, 1963 — Colombia, Ecuador
 Theridion irrugatum Gao & Li, 2014 — China
 Theridion ischagosum Barrion & Litsinger, 1995 — Philippines
 Theridion isorium Levi, 1963 — Peru
 Theridion istokpoga Levi, 1957 — USA to Panama
 Theridion italiense Wunderlich, 1995 — Italy, Macedonia, Romania
 Theridion jordanense Levy & Amitai, 1982 — Egypt, Israel, Syria
 Theridion kambalum Barrion & Litsinger, 1995 — Philippines
 Theridion karamayense Zhu, 1998 — China
 Theridion kauaiense Simon, 1900 — Hawaii
 Theridion kawea Levi, 1957 — USA, Mexico
 Theridion kibonotense Tullgren, 1910 — East Africa
 Theridion kiliani Müller & Heimer, 1990 — Colombia
 Theridion kobrooricum Strand, 1911 — Indonesia (Aru Is.)
 Theridion kochi Roewer, 1942 — Samoa
 Theridion kraepelini Simon, 1905 — Indonesia (Java)
 Theridion kraussi Marples, 1957 — Fiji
 Theridion lacticolor Berland, 1920 — Kenya, Yemen, Madagascar
 Theridion laevigatum Blackwall, 1870 — Italy
 Theridion lago Levi, 1963 — Ecuador
 Theridion lamperti Strand, 1906 — Ethiopia
 Theridion lanceatum Zhang & Zhu, 2007 — China
 Theridion lapidicola Kulczyński, 1887 — Italy
 Theridion latisternum Caporiacco, 1934 — Karakorum
 Theridion lawrencei Gertsch & Archer, 1942 — USA
 Theridion leechi Gertsch & Archer, 1942 — USA, Canada
 Theridion leguiai Chamberlin, 1916 — Colombia, Peru
 Theridion lenzianum Strand, 1907 — South Africa
 Theridion leones Levi, 1959 — Mexico
 Theridion leucophaeum Simon, 1905 — India
 Theridion leve Blackwall, 1877 — Seychelles
 Theridion leviorum Gertsch & Riechert, 1976 — USA
 Theridion liaoyuanense (Zhu & Yu, 1982) — China
 Theridion limatum Tullgren, 1910 — Tanzania
 Theridion limitatum L. Koch, 1872 — Australia (Queensland, New South Wales)
 Theridion linaresense Levi, 1963 — Chile
 Theridion linzhiense Hu, 2001 — China
 Theridion llano Levi, 1957 — USA
 Theridion logan Levi & Patrick, 2013 — USA
 Theridion lomirae Roewer, 1938 — New Guinea
 Theridion longicrure Marples, 1956 — New Zealand
 Theridion longiductum Liu & Peng, 2012 — China
 Theridion longihirsutum Strand, 1907 — China
 Theridion longioembolia Liu & Peng, 2012 — China
 Theridion longipalpum Zhu, 1998 — China, Korea
 Theridion longipedatum Roewer, 1942 — Colombia
 Theridion longipili Seo, 2004 — Korea
 Theridion ludekingi Thorell, 1890 — Indonesia (Java)
 Theridion ludius Simon, 1880 — Malaysia to Australia, New Caledonia
 Theridion lumabani Barrion & Litsinger, 1995 — Philippines
 Theridion luteitarse Schmidt & Krause, 1995 — Cape Verde Is.
 Theridion macei Simon, 1895 — Congo
 Theridion machu Levi, 1963 — Peru
 Theridion macropora Tang, Yin & Peng, 2006 — China
 Theridion macuchi Levi, 1963 — Ecuador
 Theridion maculiferum Roewer, 1942 — Tanzania (Zanzibar)
 Theridion magdalenense Müller & Heimer, 1990 — Colombia
 Theridion maindroni Simon, 1905 — India
 Theridion makotoi Yoshida, 2009 — Japan
 Theridion malagaense Wunderlich, 2011 — Spain, Italy (Sardinia)
 Theridion manjithar Tikader, 1970 — India
 Theridion manonoense Marples, 1955 — Samoa
 Theridion maranum Levi, 1963 — Venezuela
 Theridion maron Levi, 1963 — Paraguay
 Theridion martini Levi, 1959 — Mexico
 Theridion mataafa Marples, 1955 — Samoa
 Theridion mauense Caporiacco, 1949 — Kenya
 Theridion mauiense Simon, 1900 — Hawaii
 Theridion mehlum Roberts, 1983 — Seychelles (Aldabra)
 Theridion melanoplax Schmidt & Krause, 1996 — Canary Is.
 Theridion melanoprorum Thorell, 1895 — Myanmar
 Theridion melanoprorum orientale Simon, 1909 — Vietnam
 Theridion melanostictum O. Pickard-Cambridge, 1876 — Macaronesia, Mediterranean to Egypt, India, Central Asia, China, Japan. Introduced to Poland, Canada, USA, Galapagos Is., Society Is.
 Theridion melanurum Hahn, 1831 — Macaronesia, North Africa, Europe, Turkey, Caucasus, Russia (Europe to middle Siberia), Middle East. Introduced to USA
 Theridion melinum Simon, 1900 — Hawaii
 Theridion mendozae Berland, 1933 — Marquesas Is.
 Theridion meneghettii Caporiacco, 1949 — Kenya
 Theridion metabolum Chamberlin & Ivie, 1936 — Panama
 Theridion metator Simon, 1907 — Guinea-Bissau
 Theridion michelbacheri Levi, 1957 — USA
 Theridion micheneri Levi, 1963 — Panama
 Theridion minutissimum Keyserling, 1884 — Panama, Peru
 Theridion minutulum Thorell, 1895 — Myanmar
 Theridion miserum Thorell, 1898 — Myanmar
 Theridion modestum (Simon, 1894) — Sri Lanka
 Theridion molliculum Thorell, 1899 — Cameroon
 Theridion mollissimum L. Koch, 1872 — Australia, Samoa
 Theridion monzonense Levi, 1963 — Peru
 Theridion mortuale Simon, 1908 — Australia (Western Australia)
 Theridion morulum O. Pickard-Cambridge, 1898 — USA, Mexico
 Theridion mucidum Gao & Li, 2014 — China
 Theridion murarium Emerton, 1882 — North America
 Theridion musivivoides Schmidt & Krause, 1995 — Cape Verde Is.
 Theridion musivivum Schmidt, 1956 — Azores, Canary Is., Madeira
 Theridion myersi Levi, 1957 — USA, Mexico, Jamaica
 Theridion mystaceum L. Koch, 1870 — Europe, Turkey, Russia (Europe to south Siberia), China
 Theridion mysteriosum Schmidt, 1971 — Ecuador
 Theridion nadleri Levi, 1959 — Trinidad
 Theridion nagorum Roberts, 1983 — Seychelles (Aldabra)
 Theridion nasinotum Caporiacco, 1949 — Kenya
 Theridion nasutum Wunderlich, 1995 — Italy (Sardinia)
 Theridion necijaense Barrion & Litsinger, 1995 — Philippines
 Theridion negebense Levy & Amitai, 1982 — Spain, Israel
 Theridion neomexicanum Banks, 1901 — USA, Canada
 Theridion neshamini Levi, 1957 — USA
 Theridion nigriceps Keyserling, 1891 — Brazil
 Theridion nigroannulatum Keyserling, 1884 — Ecuador, Peru
 Theridion nigroplagiatum Caporiacco, 1949 — Kenya
 Theridion nigropunctulatum Thorell, 1898 — Myanmar
 Theridion nigrosacculatum Tullgren, 1910 — Tanzania
 Theridion nilgherinum Simon, 1905 — India
 Theridion niphocosmum Rainbow, 1916 — Australia (Queensland)
 Theridion niveopunctatum Thorell, 1898 — Myanmar
 Theridion niveum O. Pickard-Cambridge, 1898 — Mexico
 Theridion nivosum Rainbow, 1916 — Australia (Queensland)
 Theridion nodiferum Simon, 1895 — Sri Lanka
 Theridion nojimai Yoshida, 1999 — China, Japan
 Theridion nudum Levi, 1959 — Mexico, Panama
 Theridion oatesi Thorell, 1895 — Myanmar
 Theridion obscuratum Zhu, 1998 — China
 Theridion ochreolum Levy & Amitai, 1982 — Israel
 Theridion octoferum Strand, 1909 — South Africa
 Theridion odoratum Zhu, 1998 — China
 Theridion omiltemi Levi, 1959 — Mexico, Guatemala
 Theridion onticolum Levi, 1963 — Peru
 Theridion opolon Levi, 1963 — Brazil
 Theridion opuntia Levi, 1963 — Mexico
 Theridion orgea (Levi, 1967) — Brazil
 Theridion orlando (Archer, 1950) — USA
 Theridion osprum Levi, 1963 — Venezuela
 Theridion oswaldocruzi Levi, 1963 — Brazil
 Theridion otsospotum Barrion & Litsinger, 1995 — Philippines
 Theridion palanum Roberts, 1983 — Seychelles (Aldabra)
 Theridion palgongense Paik, 1996 — Korea
 Theridion pallasi Ponomarev, 2007 — Russia (Europe)
 Theridion pallidulum Roewer, 1942 — East Africa
 Theridion pandani Simon, 1895 — Cambodia
 Theridion panganii Caporiacco, 1947 — Tanzania
 Theridion papillatum Gao & Li, 2014 — China
 Theridion paraense Levi, 1963 — Brazil
 Theridion parvulum Blackwall, 1870 — Italy (Sicily)
 Theridion parvum Keyserling, 1884 — Peru
 Theridion patrizii Caporiacco, 1933 — Libya
 Theridion pelaezi Levi, 1963 — Mexico
 Theridion pennsylvanicum Emerton, 1913 — USA, Canada
 Theridion perkinsi Simon, 1900 — Hawaii
 Theridion pernambucum Levi, 1963 — Brazil
 Theridion perpusillum Simon, 1885 — Malaysia
 Theridion petraeum L. Koch, 1872 — North America, Europe, North Africa, Caucasus, Russia (Europe to Far East), Kazakhstan
 Theridion petrunkevitchi Berland, 1920 — East Africa
 Theridion phaeostomum Simon, 1909 — Vietnam
 Theridion pictum (Walckenaer, 1802) (type) — North America, Europe, North Africa, Caucasus, Russia (Europe to Far East), Kazakhstan, Turkemenistan, China, Japan
 Theridion pierre Levi & Patrick, 2013 — USA
 Theridion pigrum Keyserling, 1886 — Brazil
 Theridion pilatum Urquhart, 1893 — Australia (Tasmania)
 Theridion piligerum Frauenfeld, 1867 — India (Nicobar Is.)
 Theridion piliphilum Strand, 1907 — South Africa
 Theridion pinastri L. Koch, 1872 — Europe, Turkey, Caucasus, China, Korea, Japan
 Theridion pinguiculum Simon, 1909 — Vietnam
 Theridion pinicola Simon, 1873 — France (Corsica), Morocco, Algeria, Tunisia
 Theridion pires Levi, 1963 — Brazil
 Theridion piriforme Berland, 1938 — Vanuatu
 Theridion plaumanni Levi, 1963 — Venezuela, Brazil
 Theridion plectile Simon, 1909 — Vietnam
 Theridion plumipes Hasselt, 1882 — Indonesia (Sumatra)
 Theridion pluviale Tullgren, 1910 — Tanzania
 Theridion poecilum Zhu, 1998 — China
 Theridion porphyreticum Urquhart, 1889 — New Zealand
 Theridion positivum Chamberlin, 1924 — USA, Caribbean to Paraguay
 Theridion posticatum Simon, 1900 — Hawaii
 Theridion postmarginatum Tullgren, 1910 — Tanzania
 Theridion praeclusum Tullgren, 1910 — Tanzania
 Theridion praemite Simon, 1907 — Sierra Leone
 Theridion praetextum Simon, 1900 — Hawaii
 Theridion praetextum concolor Simon, 1900 — Hawaii
 Theridion prominens Blackwall, 1870 — Italy
 Theridion proximum Lawrence, 1964 — South Africa
 Theridion puellae Locket, 1980 — Comoros
 Theridion pulanense Hu, 2001 — China
 Theridion pumilio Urquhart, 1886 — New Zealand
 Theridion punctipes Emerton, 1924 — USA, Mexico
 Theridion punicapunctatum Urquhart, 1891 — New Zealand
 Theridion punongpalayum Barrion & Litsinger, 1995 — Philippines
 Theridion purcelli O. Pickard-Cambridge, 1904 — St. Helena, South Africa
 Theridion pyramidale L. Koch, 1867 — Australia (Queensland, New South Wales)
 Theridion pyrenaeum Denis, 1945 — Spain, France, Andorra
 Theridion qingzangense Hu, 2001 — China
 Theridion quadratum (O. Pickard-Cambridge, 1882) — Sri Lanka, Indonesia (Sumatra)
 Theridion quadrilineatum Lenz, 1886 — Madagascar
 Theridion quadripapulatum Thorell, 1895 — Myanmar
 Theridion quadripartitum Keyserling, 1891 — Brazil
 Theridion rabuni Chamberlin & Ivie, 1944 — USA, Bahama Is.
 Theridion rafflesi Simon, 1899 — Indonesia (Sumatra)
 Theridion rampum Levi, 1963 — Peru, Venezuela
 Theridion ravum Levi, 1963 — Venezuela
 Theridion reinhardti Charitonov, 1946 — Uzbekistan
 Theridion resum Levi, 1959 — Panama
 Theridion retreatense Strand, 1909 — South Africa
 Theridion retrocitum Simon, 1909 — Vietnam
 Theridion rhodonotum Simon, 1909 — Vietnam
 Theridion ricense Levi, 1959 — Puerto Rico
 Theridion rossi Levi, 1963 — Peru
 Theridion rostriferum Simon, 1895 — West Africa
 Theridion rothi Levi, 1959 — Mexico
 Theridion rubiginosum Keyserling, 1884 — Brazil
 Theridion rubrum (Keyserling, 1886) — Brazil
 Theridion rurrenabaque Levi, 1963 — Bolivia
 Theridion ruwenzoricola Strand, 1913 — Central Africa
 Theridion saanichum Chamberlin & Ivie, 1947 — USA, Canada
 Theridion sabinjonis Strand, 1913 — Central Africa
 Theridion sadani Monga & Singh, 1989 — India
 Theridion samoense Berland, 1929 — Samoa
 Theridion sanctum Levi, 1959 — Mexico
 Theridion sangzhiense Zhu, 1998 — China
 Theridion sardis Chamberlin & Ivie, 1944 — USA
 Theridion saropus Thorell, 1887 — Myanmar
 Theridion schlingeri Levi, 1963 — Peru
 Theridion schrammeli Levi, 1963 — Mexico
 Theridion sciaphilum Benoit, 1977 — St. Helena
 Theridion semitinctum Simon, 1914 — Spain (mainland, Balearic Is.), France, Italy
 Theridion senckenbergi Levi, 1963 — Venezuela
 Theridion septempunctatum Berland, 1933 — Marquesas Is.
 Theridion sertatum Simon, 1909 — Vietnam
 Theridion setiferum Roewer, 1942 — Myanmar
 Theridion setosum L. Koch, 1872 — Australia (Queensland), Vanuatu, Samoa, New Caledonia
 Theridion setum Zhu, 1998 — China
 Theridion sibiricum Marusik, 1988 — Russia (Urals to Far East), Kazakhastan, Mongolia
 Theridion sinaloa Levi, 1959 — Mexico
 Theridion soaresi Levi, 1963 — Brazil, Paraguay
 Theridion societatis Berland, 1934 — French Polynesia (Society Is.: Tahiti)
 Theridion solium Benoit, 1977 — St. Helena
 Theridion spinigerum Rainbow, 1916 — Australia (Queensland)
 Theridion spinitarse O. Pickard-Cambridge, 1876 — North Africa, Saudi Arabia, Yemen
 Theridion spinosissimum Caporiacco, 1934 — Karakorum
 Theridion squalidum Urquhart, 1886 — New Zealand
 Theridion squamosum Gao & Li, 2014 — China
 Theridion stamotum Levi, 1963 — Venezuela
 Theridion stannardi Levi, 1963 — Mexico
 Theridion strepitus Peck & Shear, 1987 — Ecuador (Galapagos Is.)
 Theridion striatum Keyserling, 1884 — Brazil
 Theridion styligerum F. O. Pickard-Cambridge, 1902 — Mexico, Guatemala
 Theridion subitum O. Pickard-Cambridge, 1885 — India
 Theridion submirabile Zhu & Song, 1993 — China, Korea
 Theridion submissum Gertsch & Davis, 1936 — USA, Mexico, Bahama Is., Jamaica
 Theridion subpingue Simon, 1908 — Australia (Western Australia)
 Theridion subplaumanni Liu & Peng, 2012 — China
 Theridion subradiatum Simon, 1901 — Malaysia
 Theridion subrotundum Keyserling, 1891 — Brazil
 Theridion subvittatum Simon, 1889 — India
 Theridion sulawesiense Marusik & Penney, 2004 — Indonesia (Sulawesi)
 Theridion swarczewskii Werjbitzky, 1902 — Azerbaijan
 Theridion t-notatum Thorell, 1895 — Myanmar, Malaysia, Singapore
 Theridion taegense Paik, 1996 — Korea
 Theridion tahitiae Berland, 1934 — Tahiti
 Theridion tamerlani Roewer, 1942 — Myanmar
 Theridion tayrona Müller & Heimer, 1990 — Colombia
 Theridion tebanum Levi, 1963 — Venezuela
 Theridion teliferum Simon, 1895 — Sri Lanka
 Theridion tenellum C. L. Koch, 1841 — Greece
 Theridion tengchongensis Liu & Peng, 2012 — China
 Theridion tenuissimum Thorell, 1898 — Myanmar
 Theridion teresae Levi, 1963 — Trinidad, Brazil
 Theridion tessellatum Thorell, 1899 — Cameroon
 Theridion teutanoides Caporiacco, 1949 — Kenya
 Theridion thalia Workman, 1878 — Myanmar
 Theridion theridioides (Keyserling, 1890) — China, Australia (Queensland, New South Wales)
 Theridion thorelli L. Koch, 1865 — Australia (New South Wales)
 Theridion tikaderi Patel, 1973 — India
 Theridion timpanogos Levi, 1957 — USA
 Theridion tinctorium Keyserling, 1891 — Brazil
 Theridion todinum Simon, 1880 — New Caledonia
 Theridion topo Levi, 1963 — Ecuador
 Theridion torosum Keyserling, 1884 — Peru
 Theridion trahax Blackwall, 1866 — Africa
 Theridion transgressum Petrunkevitch, 1911 — USA, Mexico
 Theridion trepidum O. Pickard-Cambridge, 1898 — Mexico to Panama
 Theridion triangulare Franganillo, 1936 — Cuba
 Theridion trifile Simon, 1907 — West, East Africa
 Theridion trigonicum Thorell, 1890 — Indonesia (Sumatra, Java)
 Theridion tristani Levi, 1959 — Costa Rica
 Theridion triviale Thorell, 1881 — Australia
 Theridion trizonatum Caporiacco, 1949 — Kenya
 Theridion tubicola Doleschall, 1859 — Indonesia (Java, Moluccas), New Guinea
 Theridion turanicum Charitonov, 1946 — Uzbekistan
 Theridion turrialba Levi, 1959 — Costa Rica
 Theridion uber Keyserling, 1884 — Brazil
 Theridion uhligi Martin, 1974 — Europe
 Theridion umbilicus Levi, 1963 — Brazil
 Theridion uncatum F. O. Pickard-Cambridge, 1902 — Mexico
 Theridion undatum Zhu, 1998 — China
 Theridion undulanotum Roewer, 1942 — Vanuatu
 Theridion urnigerum Thorell, 1898 — Myanmar
 Theridion ursoi Caporiacco, 1947 — Ethiopia
 Theridion urucum Levi, 1963 — Brazil
 Theridion usitum Strand, 1913 — Central Africa
 Theridion utcuyacu Levi, 1963 — Peru
 Theridion valleculum Levi, 1959 — Panama
 Theridion vallisalinarum Levy & Amitai, 1982 — Israel
 Theridion vanhoeffeni Strand, 1909 — South Africa
 Theridion varians Hahn, 1833 — North America, Europe, North Africa, Turkey, Caucasus, Russia (Europe to Siberia), Central Asia, China
 Theridion varians cyrenaicum Caporiacco, 1933 — Libya
 Theridion varians rusticum Simon, 1873 — Western Mediterranean
 Theridion ventricosum Rainbow, 1916 — Australia (Queensland)
 Theridion vespertinum Levy, 1985 — Israel
 Theridion viridanum Urquhart, 1887 — New Zealand
 Theridion volubile Keyserling, 1884 — Venezuela, Ecuador, Peru
 Theridion vosseleri Strand, 1907 — East Africa
 Theridion vossi Strand, 1907 — Cameroon
 Theridion vossioni Simon, 1884 — Sudan
 Theridion vulvum Levi, 1959 — Panama
 Theridion weberi Thorell, 1892 — Singapore
 Theridion weyrauchi Levi, 1963 — Peru
 Theridion whitcombi Sedgwick, 1973 — Chile
 Theridion wiehlei Schenkel, 1938 — Spain, France, Algeria, Russia (Europe), Kazakhstan
 Theridion workmani Thorell, 1887 — Myanmar
 Theridion xanthostichum (Rainbow, 1916) — Australia (Queensland)
 Theridion xianfengense Zhu & Song, 1992 — China, Taiwan
 Theridion yani Zhu, 1998 — China
 Theridion yuma Levi, 1963 — USA
 Theridion yunnanense Schenkel, 1963 — China
 Theridion zantholabio Urquhart, 1886 — New Zealand
 Theridion zebra Caporiacco, 1949 — Kenya
 Theridion zekharya Levy, 2007 — Israel
 Theridion zhangmuense Hu, 2001 — China
 Theridion zhaoi Zhu, 1998 — China
 Theridion zhoui Zhu, 1998 — China
 Theridion zonarium Keyserling, 1884 — Peru
 Theridion zonatum Eydoux & Souleyet, 1841 — Unknown
 Theridion zonulatum Thorell, 1890 — India, China, Thailand, Singapore, Indonesia (Sumatra, Borneo)

Theridula

Theridula Emerton, 1882
 Theridula aelleni (Hubert, 1970) — Spain, Madeira, Tunisia
 Theridula albonigra Caporiacco, 1949 — Kenya
 Theridula albonigra vittata Caporiacco, 1949 — Kenya
 Theridula casas Levi, 1954 — Mexico
 Theridula emertoni Levi, 1954 — USA, Canada
 Theridula faceta (O. Pickard-Cambridge, 1894) — Mexico, Guatemala
 Theridula gonygaster (Simon, 1873) — Central and South America, Caribbean. Introduced to Europe, Congo, Madagascar, Seychelles, Georgia, China, Japan
 Theridula huberti Benoit, 1977 — St. Helena
 Theridula iriomotensis Yoshida, 2001 — Japan
 Theridula multiguttata Keyserling, 1886 — Brazil
 Theridula nigerrima (Petrunkevitch, 1911) — Ecuador, Peru
 Theridula opulenta (Walckenaer, 1841) (type) — North America. Introduced to southern Europe
 Theridula perlata Simon, 1889 — Madagascar
 Theridula puebla Levi, 1954 — Mexico, Panama
 Theridula pulchra Berland, 1920 — East Africa
 Theridula sexpupillata Mello-Leitão, 1941 — Brazil
 Theridula theriella Strand, 1907 — Madagascar
 Theridula zhangmuensis Hu, 2001 — China

Thwaitesia

Thwaitesia O. Pickard-Cambridge, 1881
 Thwaitesia affinis O. Pickard-Cambridge, 1882 — Panama to Paraguay
 Thwaitesia algerica Simon, 1895 — Algeria
 Thwaitesia argentata Thorell, 1890 — Indonesia (Sumatra)
 Thwaitesia argenteoguttata (Tullgren, 1910) — Kenya, Tanzania
 Thwaitesia argenteosquamata (Lenz, 1891) — Madagascar
 Thwaitesia argentiopunctata (Rainbow, 1916) — Australia (Queensland)
 Thwaitesia aureosignata (Lenz, 1891) — Madagascar
 Thwaitesia bracteata (Exline, 1950) — Trinidad, Colombia to Paraguay
 Thwaitesia dangensis Patel & Patel, 1972 — India
 Thwaitesia glabicauda Zhu, 1998 — China
 Thwaitesia inaurata (Vinson, 1863) — Réunion
 Thwaitesia margaritifera O. Pickard-Cambridge, 1881 (type) — India, Sri Lanka, China, Vietnam
 Thwaitesia meruensis (Tullgren, 1910) — Tanzania
 Thwaitesia nigrimaculata Song, Zhang & Zhu, 2006 — China
 Thwaitesia nigronodosa (Rainbow, 1912) — Australia (Queensland)
 Thwaitesia phoenicolegna Thorell, 1895 — Myanmar, Vietnam
 Thwaitesia pulcherrima Butler, 1883 — Madagascar
 Thwaitesia rhomboidalis Simon, 1903 — Equatorial Guinea
 Thwaitesia scintillans Kulczyński, 1911 — New Guinea
 Thwaitesia simoni (Keyserling, 1884) — Brazil
 Thwaitesia spinicauda Thorell, 1895 — Myanmar
 Thwaitesia splendida Keyserling, 1884 — Panama to Venezuela
 Thwaitesia turbinata Simon, 1903 — Sierra Leone

Thymoites

Thymoites Keyserling, 1884
 Thymoites aloitus Levi, 1964 — Brazil
 Thymoites amprus Levi, 1964 — Panama
 Thymoites anicus Levi, 1964 — Brazil
 Thymoites anserma Levi, 1964 — Colombia
 Thymoites banksi (Bryant, 1948) — Hispaniola
 Thymoites bellissimus (L. Koch, 1879) — Scandinavia, Russia (Europe to Far East), China
 Thymoites bocaina Rodrigues & Brescovit, 2015 — Brazil
 Thymoites bogus (Levi, 1959) — Panama
 Thymoites boneti (Levi, 1959) — Mexico
 Thymoites boquete (Levi, 1959) — Mexico to Panama
 Thymoites bradti (Levi, 1959) — Mexico
 Thymoites camano (Levi, 1957) — USA
 Thymoites camaqua Rodrigues & Brescovit, 2015 — Brazil
 Thymoites cancellatus Mello-Leitão, 1943 — Argentina
 Thymoites caracasanus (Simon, 1895) — Guatemala to Ecuador
 Thymoites chiapensis (Levi, 1959) — Mexico
 Thymoites chickeringi (Levi, 1959) — Panama
 Thymoites chikunii (Yoshida, 1988) — Japan
 Thymoites chopardi (Berland, 1920) — East Africa
 Thymoites confraternus (Banks, 1898) — Mexico to Peru
 Thymoites corus (Levi, 1959) — Mexico
 Thymoites crassipes Keyserling, 1884 (type) — Peru
 Thymoites cravilus Marques & Buckup, 1992 — Brazil
 Thymoites cristal Rodrigues & Brescovit, 2015 — Brazil
 Thymoites delicatulus (Levi, 1959) — Mexico to Venezuela
 Thymoites ebus Levi, 1964 — Brazil
 Thymoites elongatus Peng, Yin & Hu, 2008 — China
 Thymoites expulsus (Gertsch & Mulaik, 1936) — USA, Mexico, Cuba, Jamaica
 Thymoites gertrudae Müller & Heimer, 1990 — Colombia
 Thymoites gibbithorax (Simon, 1894) — Venezuela
 Thymoites guanicae (Petrunkevitch, 1930) — Mexico, Greater Antilles
 Thymoites hupingensis Gan & Peng, 2015 — China
 Thymoites ilhabela Rodrigues & Brescovit, 2015 — Brazil
 Thymoites illudens (Gertsch & Mulaik, 1936) — USA to Colombia
 Thymoites ilvan Levi, 1964 — Brazil
 Thymoites incachaca Levi, 1964 — Bolivia
 Thymoites indicatus (Banks, 1929) — Nicaragua to Panama
 Thymoites ipiranga Levi, 1964 — Brazil
 Thymoites iritus Levi, 1964 — Brazil
 Thymoites levii Gruia, 1973 — Cuba
 Thymoites lobifrons (Simon, 1894) — Venezuela
 Thymoites lori Levi, 1964 — Peru
 Thymoites luculentus (Simon, 1894) — Mexico to Panama, St. Vincent
 Thymoites machu Levi, 1967 — Peru
 Thymoites maderae (Gertsch & Archer, 1942) — USA to Panama
 Thymoites maracayensis Levi, 1964 — Venezuela, Brazil
 Thymoites marxi (Crosby, 1906) — USA, Mexico
 Thymoites matachic (Levi, 1959) — Mexico
 Thymoites melloleitaoni (Bristowe, 1938) — Brazil
 Thymoites minero Roth, 1992 — USA
 Thymoites minnesota Levi, 1964 — USA, Canada
 Thymoites mirus Levi, 1964 — Brazil
 Thymoites missionensis (Levi, 1957) — USA to Costa Rica
 Thymoites murici Rodrigues & Brescovit, 2015 — Brazil
 Thymoites nentwigi Yoshida, 1994 — Indonesia (Krakatau)
 Thymoites nevada Müller & Heimer, 1990 — Colombia
 Thymoites notabilis (Levi, 1959) — Panama
 Thymoites oleatus (L. Koch, 1879) — Canada, Greenland, Russia (Europe to Far East)
 Thymoites orilla (Levi, 1959) — Mexico
 Thymoites pallidus (Emerton, 1913) — USA, Caribbean to Venezuela
 Thymoites palo Levi, 1967 — Brazil
 Thymoites peruanus (Keyserling, 1886) — Peru
 Thymoites piarco (Levi, 1959) — Trinidad, Brazil
 Thymoites pictipes (Banks, 1904) — USA
 Thymoites pinheiral Rodrigues & Brescovit, 2015 — Brazil
 Thymoites piratini Rodrigues & Brescovit, 2015 — Brazil
 Thymoites praemollis (Simon, 1909) — Vietnam
 Thymoites prolatus (Levi, 1959) — Panama
 Thymoites promatensis Lise & Silva, 2009 — Brazil
 Thymoites puer (Mello-Leitão, 1941) — Mexico, Brazil, Argentina
 Thymoites ramon Levi, 1964 — Peru
 Thymoites ramosus Gao & Li, 2014 — China
 Thymoites rarus (Keyserling, 1886) — Brazil
 Thymoites reservatus (Levi, 1959) — Panama
 Thymoites sanctus (Chamberlin, 1916) — Peru
 Thymoites sarasota (Levi, 1957) — USA
 Thymoites sclerotis (Levi, 1957) — USA, Mexico
 Thymoites simla (Levi, 1959) — Trinidad
 Thymoites simplex (Bryant, 1940) — Cuba
 Thymoites struthio (Simon, 1895) — Venezuela, Bolivia
 Thymoites stylifrons (Simon, 1894) — Panama, Venezuela, St. Vincent
 Thymoites subtilis (Simon, 1894) — Tanzania (Zanzibar)
 Thymoites tabuleiro Rodrigues & Brescovit, 2015 — Brazil
 Thymoites taiobeiras Rodrigues & Brescovit, 2015 — Brazil
 Thymoites trisetaceus Peng, Yin & Griswold, 2008 — China
 Thymoites ulleungensis (Paik, 1991) — Korea
 Thymoites unimaculatus (Emerton, 1882) — USA, Canada
 Thymoites unisignatus (Simon, 1894) — Colombia, Venezuela
 Thymoites urubamba Levi, 1967 — Peru
 Thymoites verus (Levi, 1959) — Mexico
 Thymoites villarricaensis Levi, 1964 — Paraguay
 Thymoites vivus (O. Pickard-Cambridge, 1899) — Costa Rica
 Thymoites wangi Zhu, 1998 — China
 Thymoites yaginumai Yoshida, 1995 — Japan

Tidarren

Tidarren Chamberlin & Ivie, 1934
 Tidarren aethiops Knoflach & van Harten, 2006 — Congo
 Tidarren afrum Knoflach & van Harten, 2006 — Cameroon, Uganda
 Tidarren apartiolum Knoflach & van Harten, 2006 — Madagascar
 Tidarren argo Knoflach & van Harten, 2001 — Yemen, Chad
 Tidarren circe Knoflach & van Harten, 2006 — Namibia
 Tidarren cuneolatum (Tullgren, 1910) — Cape Verde Is., Canary Is., Africa, Yemen
 Tidarren dasyglossa Knoflach & van Harten, 2006 — Madagascar
 Tidarren dentigerum Knoflach & van Harten, 2006 — Yemen
 Tidarren ephemerum Knoflach & van Harten, 2006 — Madagascar
 Tidarren gracile Knoflach & van Harten, 2006 — Yemen
 Tidarren griswoldi Knoflach & van Harten, 2006 — Cameroon
 Tidarren haemorrhoidale (Bertkau, 1880) — USA to Argentina
 Tidarren horaki Knoflach & van Harten, 2006 — Madagascar
 Tidarren konrad Knoflach & van Harten, 2006 — Yemen
 Tidarren lanceolatum Knoflach & van Harten, 2006 — Congo
 Tidarren levii Schmidt, 1957 — Congo
 Tidarren mixtum (O. Pickard-Cambridge, 1896) — Mexico to Costa Rica
 Tidarren obtusum Knoflach & van Harten, 2006 — Madagascar
 Tidarren perplexum Knoflach & van Harten, 2006 — Cameroon, Congo
 Tidarren scenicum (Thorell, 1899) — Cameroon, Guinea-Bissau, Ivory Coast, South Africa
 Tidarren sheba Knoflach & van Harten, 2006 — Yemen
 Tidarren sisyphoides (Walckenaer, 1841) (type) — USA to Argentina, Caribbean
 Tidarren ubickorum Knoflach & van Harten, 2006 — South Africa
 Tidarren usambara Knoflach & van Harten, 2006 — Tanzania

Tomoxena

Tomoxena Simon, 1895
 Tomoxena alearia (Thorell, 1890) — Indonesia (Java, Sumatra)
 Tomoxena dives Simon, 1895 (type) — India
 Tomoxena flavomaculata Simon, 1895 — Indonesia (Sumatra)

W

Wamba

Wamba O. Pickard-Cambridge, 1896
 Wamba congener O. Pickard-Cambridge, 1896 (type) — USA, Caribbean to Argentina
 Wamba crispulus (Simon, 1895) — Canada to Brazil, Caribbean
 Wamba panamensis (Levi, 1959) — Panama, Ecuador

Wirada

Wirada Keyserling, 1886
 Wirada araucaria Lise, Silva & Bertoncello, 2009 — Brazil
 Wirada mexicana Campuzano & Ibarra-Núñez, 2018 — Mexico
 Wirada punctata Keyserling, 1886 (type) — Venezuela, Ecuador, Peru
 Wirada sigillata Lise, Silva & Bertoncello, 2009 — Brazil, Argentina
 Wirada tijuca Levi, 1967 — Brazil
 Wirada tovarensis Simon, 1895 — Venezuela

Y

Yaginumena

Yaginumena Yoshida, 2002
 Yaginumena castrata (Bösenberg & Strand, 1906) (type) — Russia (Far East), China, Korea, Japan
 Yaginumena maculosa (Yoshida & Ono, 2000) — Turkey, Caucasus (Georgia, Azerbaijan), India, China, Korea, Japan
 Yaginumena mutilata (Bösenberg & Strand, 1906) — Korea, Japan

Yoroa

Yoroa Baert, 1984
 Yoroa clypeoglandularis Baert, 1984 (type) — New Guinea
 Yoroa taylori Harvey & Waldock, 2000 — Australia (Queensland)

Yunohamella

Yunohamella Yoshida, 2007
 Yunohamella gibbosa Gao & Li, 2014 — China
 Yunohamella lyrica (Walckenaer, 1841) — North America, Korea, Japan
 Yunohamella palmgreni (Marusik & Tsellarius, 1986) — Finland, Poland, Estonia, Russia (Europe to west Siberia)
 Yunohamella serpatusa (Guan & Zhu, 1993) — Russia (Urals to Far East), China, Korea
 Yunohamella subadulta (Bösenberg & Strand, 1906) — Russia (Far East), Korea, Japan
 Yunohamella takasukai Yoshida, 2012 — Indonesia (Java)
 Yunohamella yunohamensis (Bösenberg & Strand, 1906) (type) — Russia (Sakhalin, Kurile Is.), Korea, Japan

Z

Zercidium

Zercidium Benoit, 1977
 Zercidium helenense Benoit, 1977 (type) — St. Helena

References

Theridiidae